= Staden Package =

DNA sequence assembly software

- Original author: Rodger Staden
- Developers: James Bonfield, et al.
- Initial release: 1977; 49 years ago
- Stable release: 2.0.0b9 / 24 January 2012; 13 years ago
- Preview release: 2.0.0b11 / 25 April 2016; 9 years ago
- Repository: sourceforge.net/projects/staden
- Written in: C, C++, Fortran, Tcl
- Operating system: Unix, Linux, macOS, Windows
- Platform: IA-32, x86-64
- Available in: English
- Type: Bioinformatics
- License: BSD 3-clause
- Website: staden.sourceforge.net

The Staden Package is computer software, a set of tools for DNA sequence assembly, editing, and sequence analysis. It is open-source software, released under a BSD 3-clause license.

== Package components ==
The Staden package consists of several different programs. The main components are:

- pregap4 – base calling with Phred, end clipping, and vector trimming
- trev – trace viewing and editing
- gap4 – sequence assembly, contig editing, and finishing
- gap5 – assembly visualising, editing, and finishing of NGS data
- Spin – DNA and protein sequence analysis

== History ==
The Staden Package was developed by Rodger Staden's group at the Medical Research Council (MRC) Laboratory of Molecular Biology, Cambridge, England, since 1977. The package was available free to academic users, with 2,500 licenses issued in 2003 and an estimated 10,000 users, when funding for further development ended. The package was converted to open-source in 2004, and several new versions have been released since.

During the years of active development, the Staden group published a number of widely used file formats and ideas, including the SCF file format, the use of sequence quality scores to generate accurate consensus sequences, and the ZTR file format.

== See also ==
- Genome Compiler
- Phred base calling
- Phrap
- Consed
- CodonCode Aligner
- MacVector
- UGENE
- Vector NTI
