= List of alignment visualization software =

This page is a subsection of the list of sequence alignment software.

Multiple alignment visualization tools typically serve four purposes:

- Aid general understanding of large-scale DNA or protein alignments
- Visualize alignments for figures and publication
- Manually edit and curate automatically generated alignments
- Analysis in depth

The rest of this article is focused on only multiple global alignments of homologous proteins. The first two are a natural consequence of most representations of alignments and their annotation being human-unreadable and best portrayed in the familiar sequence row and alignment column format, of which examples are widespread in the literature. The third is necessary because algorithms for both multiple sequence alignment and structural alignment use heuristics which do not always perform perfectly. The fourth is a great example of how interactive graphical tools enable a worker involved in sequence analysis to conveniently execute a variety if different computational tools to explore an alignment's phylogenetic implications; or, to predict the structure and functional properties of a specific sequence, e.g., comparative modelling.

== Alignment viewers, editors ==
| Name | Structure prediction tools integrated | Can align sequences | Can calculate phylogenetic trees | Other features | Format support | License | Can run on Browser | Operating Platforms | Link |
|---|---|---|---|---|---|---|---|---|---|
| Alan | No | No | No | Allows sequence alignments to be viewed quickly and directly in a linux terminal without X-forwarding | FASTA, Clustal | Free, GPL 3 | No | Linux Terminal | Official website |
| Ale (emacs plugin) | No | Yes | No | No | GenBank, EMBL, FASTA, PHYLIP | Free, GPL | No | GNU Emacs | Official website |
| AliView 1.31.x (updated Feb 2026) | No | MUSCLE integrated; other programs such as MAFFT can be defined | External programs such as FastTree can be called from within | Fast, easy navigation through unlimited mouse wheel zoom in-out feature. Handles unlimited file size alignments. Degenerate primer design. | FASTA, FASTQ, PHYLIP, Nexus, MSF, Clustal | Free, GPL 3 | No | Cross-platform -Mac OS, Linux, Windows | Official website |
| alv | No | No | No | Console-based (no GUI), yet with colors. Coding DNA is coloured by codon. | FASTA, PHYLIP, Nexus, Clustal, Stockholm | Free, GPL 3 | No | Cross-platform | Official website, see also alv on GitHub |
| arb | structure editable, show bond in helix sequence regions, 2D molecule viewer | MUSCLE, MAFFT, ClustalW, ProbCons, FastAligner (region-align+auto-reference) | arb-parsimony & -NJ, RAxML, PHYML, Phylip, FastTree2, MrBayes | Edits huge alignments and trees. Supports NUCs + AA. Displays codons below DNA. Custom column highlighting (e.g. by conservation profiles). Designs, matches and visualizes probes. | FASTA, GenBank, EMBL, Newick | Proprietary, freeware, arb license, open modifiable source | No | Linux, Mac OS (homebrew) | Official website |
| Base-By-Base | No | MUSCLE | UPGMA, NJ, complete and single linkages, WPMGA | Visual summary, percent identity tables, some integrated advanced analysis tools | Genbank, FASTA, EMBEL, Clustal, base-by-base files | Proprietary, freeware, must register | No | Windows / macOS / Linux | Official website |
| BioEdit | No | ClustalW | Rudimentary, can read PHYLIP | Plasmid drawing, ABI chromatograms, | Genbank, FASTA, PHYLIP 3.2 and 4, NBRF-PIR | Proprietary, freeware | No | Windows (95/98/NT/2000/XP) | Official website |
| BioNumerics | No | Yes | Yes | ? | Genbank, FASTA | Proprietary, commercial | No | Windows as a client application | Official website |
| bioSyntax | No | No | No | Native syntax highlighting support for Vim, less, gedit and Sublime | FASTA, FASTQ, Clustal, SAM, VCF and more | Free, GPL 3 | No | Vim, Less, GEdit, & Sublime | Official website |
| BoxShade | No | No | No | Specifically for multiple alignments | MSF format as written by PILEUP, READSEQ, or SEQIO (fmtseq); ALN format as written by ClustalW | Free, public domain | No | MSDOS, VMS | Official website |
| CINEMA | No, but can read-show 2D structure annotations | ClustalW | No | Dotplot, 6 frame translation, Blast | Nexus, MSF, Clustal, FASTA, PHYLIP, PIR, PRINTS | Proprietary, freeware | No | Cross-platform -Mac OS, Linux, Windows | Official website |
| CLC viewer (free version) | Commercial version only | Clustal, MUSCLE, T-Coffee, MAFFT, Kalign, various | UPGMA, NJ | Workflows, blast-genbank search | many | Proprietary, freeware. More options available in commercial versions. | No | Windows / macOS / Linux | Official website |
| CIAlign | No | No | No | Alignment visualisation as publication-ready images, alignment cleaning. | FASTA | Free, MIT | No | Linux, Windows, MacOS | Official website Publication |
| ClustalX viewer | No | ClustalW | NJ | Alignment quality analysis | Nexus, MSF, Clustal, FASTA, PHYLIP | Proprietary, freeware for academic use | No | Command line | Official website |
| CodonCode Aligner | no, but can read, add & show structure annotations | Clustal, MUSCLE, various built-in algorithms | Yes | Multi- and pairwise alignments, assembly, sequence translation, editing, trimming, mutation detection, restriction analysis, cloning, primer design, dotplot, much more | ABI, SCF, FASTA, FASTQ, Nexus/PAUP or PHYLIP, Sam, Bam, .dna, EMBL, GenBank, BLAST, GFF | Proprietary, commercial, Viewer is Freeware | No | Mac OS, Windows | Official website |
| Cylindrical Alignment App | No | No | No | 3D, animation, drilldown, legend selection | BLAST XML, proprietary XML, GFF3, ClustalW, INSDSet, user expandable with XSLT | Free, CDDL 1. Available for dual licensing. | No | Cross-platform -Mac OS, Linux, Windows | Official website |
| Cylindrical BLAST Viewer | No | No | No | 3D, animation, drilldown, legend selection | BLAST XML, proprietary XML, GFF3, ClustalW, INSDSet, user expandable with XSLT | Free, GPL | No | Linux, Windows, MacOS | Official website |
| DECIPHER | Yes | Yes | UPGMA, NJ, ML | Primer-Probe design, Chimera finding | FASTA, FASTQ, GenBank | Free, GPL | No | Mac OS, Windows | Official website |
| Discovery Studio | Yes | Align123, ClustalW, S-ALIGN | UPGMA, NJ, with bootstrap and best tree | Visualizer supports 2D and 3D structure and sequence; full version has comprehensive functionality for protein, nucleotides, more | BSML, EMBL, GB, HELM, Clustal, FASTA, GDE, PDB, SEQ, SPT, ... | Proprietary, commercial, Viewer is Freeware | No | Linux, Windows | Official website |
| DnaSP | ? | ? | ? | Can compute several population genetics statistics, reconstruct haplotypes with PHASE | FASTA, Nexus, MEGA, PHYLIP | Proprietary, commercial, freeware for noncommercial use | No | Cross-platform -Mac OS, Linux, Windows | Official website |
| DNASTAR Lasergene Molecular Biology Suite | Yes | Yes | Yes | Align DNA, RNA, protein, or DNA + protein sequences via a variety of pairwise and multiple sequence alignment algorithms, generate phylogenetic trees to predict evolutionary relationships, explore sequence tracks to view GC content, gap fraction, sequence logos, translation | ABI, DNA Multi-Seq, FASTA, GCG Pileup, GenBank, Phred | Proprietary, commercial, academic licenses available | No | Mac OS, Windows | Official website |
| emacs - biomode | ? | ? | ? | ? | ? | Free, GPL | No | ? | Official website |
| FLAK | No | Can perform fuzzy whole genome alignment | No | Very fast, highly customisable, visualisation is WYSIWYG with filtering and fuzzy options | FASTA | Proprietary, commercial, freeware for noncommercial use | No | ? | Official website |
| Genedoc | No, but can read-show annotations | Pairwise | No, but can read-show annotations | gel simulation, stats, multiple views, simple | many | Proprietary, freeware | No | ? | Official website table of features |
| Geneious | Yes - powered by EMBOSS tools | Clustal, MUSCLE, MAUVE, profile, translation | UPGMA, NJ, PhyML, MrBayes plugin, PAUP* plugin | Whole genome assembly, restriction analysis, cloning, primer design, dotplot, much more | >40 file formats imported and exported | Proprietary, commercial; personal, floating | Yes | Cross-platform - Mac, Windows, Linux | Official website |
| Integrated Genome Browser (IGB) | No | No | No | Sequences and features from files, URLs, and arbitrary DAS and QuickLoad servers | BAM, FASTA, PSL | Free, CPL | No | Cross-platform - Mac, Windows, Linux | Official website |
| interactive Tree Of Life (iTOL) | No | No | ? | Phylogenetic tree viewer-annotation tool which can visualise alignments directly on the tree. Various other dataset types can be displayed in addition to alignments. | FASTA | Proprietary, free use | Yes | Browser | Official website |
| IVisTMSA | No | Clustal Omega, ClustalW2, MAFFT, MUSCLE, BioJava are integrated to construct alignment | Tree calculation tool calculates phylogenetic tree using BioJava API and lets user draw trees using Archaeopteryx | Software is package of 7 interactive visual tools for multiple sequence alignments. Major focus is manipulating large alignments. Includes MSApad, MSA comparator, MSA reconstruction tool, FASTA generator and MSA ID matrix calculator | ClustalW, MSF, PHYLIP, PIR, GDE, Nexus | Proprietary, freeware | No | ? | www.ivistmsa.com |
| Jalview | Secondary structure prediction via JPred 4 | Clustal O, Clustal, GLprobs, MSAprobs, MUSCLE, MAFFT, Probcons, TCoffee, via web services | UPGMA, NJ | Sequences and features retrieved from user-configurable and publicly registered servers, e.g. EMBL, EBI, PDB, Pfam, Rfam, UniProt Accession retrieval. Structure/model data retrieval from PDB and 3D-Beacons including PDBe, AlphaFold DB, SWISS-MODEL. | FASTA, Pfam, MSF, Clustal, BLC, PIR, Stockholm, VCF, AMSA, BioJSON, Clustal, ENA, GenBank, GFF2, GFF3, JnetFile, PHYLIP, PileUp, RNAML, CIF, mmCIF, PDB. | Free, GPL | JalviewJS (JavaScript) | Cross-platform - macOS, Linux, Windows, other with Java Virtual Machine. | Official website |
| Jevtrace | Integrated with structure viewer WebMol | No | No | A multivalent browser for sequence alignment, phylogeny, and structure. Performs an interactive Evolutionary Trace and other phylogeny inspired analysis. | FASTA, MSF, Clustal, PHYLIP, Newick, PDB | Proprietary, commercial, freeware for academic use | No | Cross-platform -Mac OS, Linux, Windows | Official website manual |
| JSAV | No | No | No | A JavaScript component allowing integrating an alignment viewer into web pages | An array of JavaScript objects | Free, GPL 2 | Yes | Browser | Official website |
| Lucid Align | No | No | No | Native desktop alignment viewer, uses trackpad/mouse gestures. Allows streaming remote data | BAM, FASTQ, FASTA | Proprietary, commercial, freeware for academic use | No | Mac OS | Official website |
| Maestro | Yes | ClustalX | Yes | Mapping from sequence to 3D structure, structure-sequence editing-modeling | Clustal, FASTA PDB | Proprietary, freeware for academic use | No | ? | Official website |
| MEGA | No | Native ClustalW | UPGMA, NJ, ME, MP, with bootstrap and confidence test | Extended support to phylogenetics analysis | FASTA, Clustal, Nexus, MEGA, etc. | Proprietary, freeware, must register | No | ? | Official website |
| Molecular Operating Environment (MOE) | Yes | Yes | Yes | Part of an extensive collection of applications for sequence to structure, including homology modelling; 3D visualisation, etc. | Clustal, FASTA, PDB, EMBL, GCG, GCG_MSF, Genbank, PHYLIP, PIR, raw_seq | Proprietary | No | ? | Official website |
| MSAReveal.org | No | No | No | Optional coloring. Touching AA shows 3-letter code and sequence number. Touching consensus shows AA frequencies in that column. Counts and percentages of aromatics, charged, gaps. | FASTA | Free, Creative Commons Attribution NonCommercial Share-alike | Yes | ? | Official website |
| Multiseq (VMD plugin) | No, but can display and align 3D structures | ClustalW, MAFFT, Stamp (Structural) | Percent identity, Clustal, MAFFT, Structural | Scripting via Tcl, mapping from sequence to 3D structure | FASTA, PDB, ALN, PHYLIP, NEXUS | Proprietary, freeware, but VMD is free for noncommercial use only | No | ? | Official website |
| MView | No | No | No | Stacked alignments from blast and fasta suites, various MSA format conversions, HTML markup, consensus patterns | BLAST search, FASTA search, Clustal, HSSP, FASTA, PIR, MSF | Free, GPL | No | Cross-platform - Mac OS, Linux, Windows | Official website |
| PFAAT | No, but can display 3D structures | ClustalW | NJ | Manual annotation, conservation scores | Nexus, MSF, Clustal, FASTA, PFAAT | Proprietary, freeware | No | ? | Official website |
| Ralee (emacs plugin for RNA al. editing) | ? | RNA structure | ? | ? | Stockholm | Free, GPL | No | ? | Official website |
| S2S RNA editor | 2D structure | Rnalign | No | Base-base interactions, 2D-3D viewer | FASTA, RnaML | Proprietary, freeware | No | ? | Official website |
| Seaview | No | local MUSCLE-ClustalW | Parsimony, distance methods, PhyML | Dot-plot, vim-like editing keys | Nexus, MSF, Clustal, FASTA, PHYLIP, MASE | Free, GPL 3 | No | Linux, Mac OS, Windows | Official website |
| SeqTUI | No | No | No | sequence translation, supermatrix construction, SNP extraction, terminal-based interactive navigation | Nexus, FASTA, PHYLIP | Free, MIT | No | Linux, Mac OS, Windows, terminal | Official website |
| Seqotron | No | MUSCLE, MAFFT | UPGMA, NJ, ML (Physher) | Manual alignment, tree visualisation | Nexus, Clustal, FASTA, PHYLIP, MEGA, Stockholm, NBRF/PIR, GDE flat | Free, GPL | No | Mac OS X | Official website publication |
| Sequilab | Yes | Yes | No | Link alignment results to analysis tools (Primer design, Gel mobility and Maps, Plasmapper, siRNA design Epitope prediction), Save research logs, Create custom toolbars | Accession number, GI number, PDB ID, FASTA, drag-drop from external URL from within the user interface | Proprietary, freeware | No | ? | Official website |
| SeqPup | No | ? | ? | ? | ? | Proprietary, freeware | No | ? | Official website |
| Sequlator | No | Pairwise alignment | No | easy alignment editing | MSF | Proprietary, freeware | No | ? | Official website |
| SnipViz | No | No | No (but can display them) | Pure JavaScript and HTML; suitable to integrate in websites | FASTA, newick | Free, Apache 2.0 | Yes | Browsers | Official website, publication |
| Strap | Jnet, NNPREDICT, Coiled coil, 16 different TM-helix | 15 different methods | NJ | Dot-plot, structure-neighbors, 3D-superposition, Blast-search, Mutation-SNP analysis, Sequence features, BioJava-interface | MSF, Stockholm, ClustalW, Nexus, FASTA, PDB, Embl, GenBank, hssp, Pfam | Free, GPL | No | ? | Official website |
| Tablet | No | No | No | High-performance graphical viewer for viewing next generation sequence assemblies and alignments. | ACE, AFG, MAQ, SOAP2, SAM, BAM, FASTA, FASTQ, GFF3 | Free, BSD 2-clause | No | ? | Official website |
| UGENE | Yes | MUSCLE, Kalign, ClustalW, ClustalO, ClustalX, MAFFT, T-Coffee, Smith–Waterman algorithm | Yes | Many | FASTA, FASTQ, GenBank, EMBL, ABIF, SCF, ClustalW, Stockholm, Newick, PDB, MSF, GFF | Free, GPL | No | ? | Official website |
| VISSA sequence-structure viewer | DSSP secondary structure | ClustalX | No | Mapping from sequence to 3D structure | Clustal, FASTA | Proprietary, freeware | No | ? | Official website |
| DNApy | No | MUSCLE | No | Editing of GenBank files, plasmid drawing, ABI chromatograms, | FASTA, FASTQ, GenBank | Free, GPL 3 | ? | ? | Official website |
| Alignment Annotator | Yes | By sequence or mixed sequence and structure | Includes Archaeopteryx | DAS and user defined annotations. Scriptable. Export to HTML, Word, Jalview. | Many | Free, GPL | Yes | iOS, Android, MS-Mobile, Browsers | Official website |

== See also ==
- Sequence alignment software
- Biological data visualization
- Comparison of software for molecular mechanics modeling
