= ProbCons =

Protein multiple-sequence alignment program

In bioinformatics and proteomics, ProbCons is an open source software for probabilistic consistency-based multiple alignment of amino acid sequences. It is one of the most efficient protein multiple sequence alignment programs, since it has repeatedly demonstrated a statistically significant advantage in accuracy over similar tools, including Clustal and MAFFT.

== Algorithm ==
The following describes the basic outline of the ProbCons algorithm.

=== Step 1: Reliability of an alignment edge ===
For every pair of sequences compute the probability that letters $x_i$ and $y_i$ are paired in $a^*$ an alignment that is generated by the model.

$$\begin{align}
P(x_i \sim y_i|x,y) \ \overset{\underset{\mathrm{def}}{}}{=}& \ \Pr[x_i \sim y_i \text{ in some } a|x,y] \\[8pt]
=& \ \sum_{\text{alignment } a \atop {\text{with }x_i - y_i}} \Pr[a|x,y] \\[2pt]
=& \ \sum_{\text{alignment } a} \mathbf{1}\{x_i - y_i \in a\} \Pr[a|x,y]
\end{align}$$

(Where $\mathbf{1}\{x_i \sim y_i \in a\}$ is equal to 1 if $x_i$ and $y_i$ are in the alignment and 0 otherwise.)

=== Step 2: Maximum expected accuracy ===
The accuracy of an alignment $a^*$ with respect to another alignment $a$ is defined as the number of common aligned pairs divided by the length of the shorter sequence.

Calculate expected accuracy of each sequence:

$$\begin{align}
E_{\Pr[a|x,y]}(\operatorname{acc}(a^*,a)) & = \sum_{a}\Pr[a|x,y] \operatorname{acc}(a^*,a) \\
& = \frac{1}{\min(|x|,|y|)} \cdot \sum_{a}\mathbf{1}\{x_i \sim y_i \in a\} \Pr[a|x,y]\\
& = \frac{1}{\min(|x|,|y|)} \cdot \sum_{x_i - y_i} P(x_i \sim y_j|x,y)
\end{align}$$

This yields a maximum expected accuracy (MEA) alignment:

$E(x,y) = \arg\max_{a^*} \; E_{\Pr[a|x,y]}(\operatorname{acc}(a^*,a))$

=== Step 3: Probabilistic Consistency Transformation ===
All pairs of sequences x,y from the set of all sequences $\mathcal{S}$ are now re-estimated using all intermediate sequences z:

$P'(x_i - y_i|x,y) = \frac{1}{|\mathcal{S}|} \sum_{z} \sum_{1 \leq k \leq |z|} P(x_i \sim z_i|x,z) \cdot P(z_i \sim y_i|z,y)$

This step can be iterated.

=== Step 4: Computation of guide tree ===
Construct a guide tree by hierarchical clustering using MEA score as sequence similarity score. Cluster similarity is defined using weighted average over pairwise sequence similarity.

=== Step 5: Compute MSA ===
Finally compute the MSA using progressive alignment or iterative alignment.

== See also ==
- Sequence alignment software
- Clustal
- MUSCLE
- AMAP
- T-Coffee
- Probalign
