= MacVector =

- Developers: MacVector, Inc.
- Stable release: 18.8 / 14 July 2025
- Operating system: macOS
- Platform: Xcode
- Type: Bioinformatics
- License: commercial
- Website: macvector.com

MacVector is a commercial sequence analysis application for Apple Macintosh computers running Mac OS X. It is intended to be used by molecular biologists to help analyze, design, research and document their experiments in the laboratory. MacVector is a Universal Binary capable of running on Intel and Apple Silicon Macs.

== Features ==
MacVector is a collection of sequence analysis algorithms linked to various sequence editors, including a single sequence editor, a multiple sequence alignment editor and a contig editor. MacVector tries to use a minimum of windows and steps to access all the functionality. Functions include:

- Sequence alignment (ClustalW, Muscle and T-Coffee) and editing.
- Subsequence search and open reading frames (ORFs) analysis.
- Phylogenetic tree construction UPGMA, Neighbour joining with bootstrapping and consensus trees
- Online Database searching - Search public databases at the NCBI such as Genbank, PubMed, and UniProt.
- Perform online BLAST searches.
- Protein analysis.
- Contig assembly and chromatogram editing
- Aligning cDNA against genomic templates
- Creating dot plots of DNA to DNA, Protein to Protein and DNA to protein.
- Restriction analysis - find and view restriction cut sites. Uses digested fragments to clone genes into vectors. Stores a history of digested fragments allowing multi fragment ligations.
- PCR Primer design - easy primer design and testing. Also uses primer3
- Agarose Gel simulation.
- CRISPR INDEL analysis.

MacVector has a contig assembly plugin called Assembler that uses phred, phrap, Bowtie, SPAdes, Flye, Velvet and cross match. From September 2024 the functionality of this plugin was fully integrated into the main application and is no longer a separate plugin.

As of version 13.0.1 MacVector uses Sparkle for updating between releases.

== History ==
MacVector was originally developed by IBI in 1994. It was acquired by Kodak, and subsequently Oxford Molecular in 1996. Oxford Molecular was merged into Accelrys in 2001. It was acquired by MacVector, Inc on 1 January 2007.
