= UGENE =

Computer software for bioinformatics

- UGENE logo

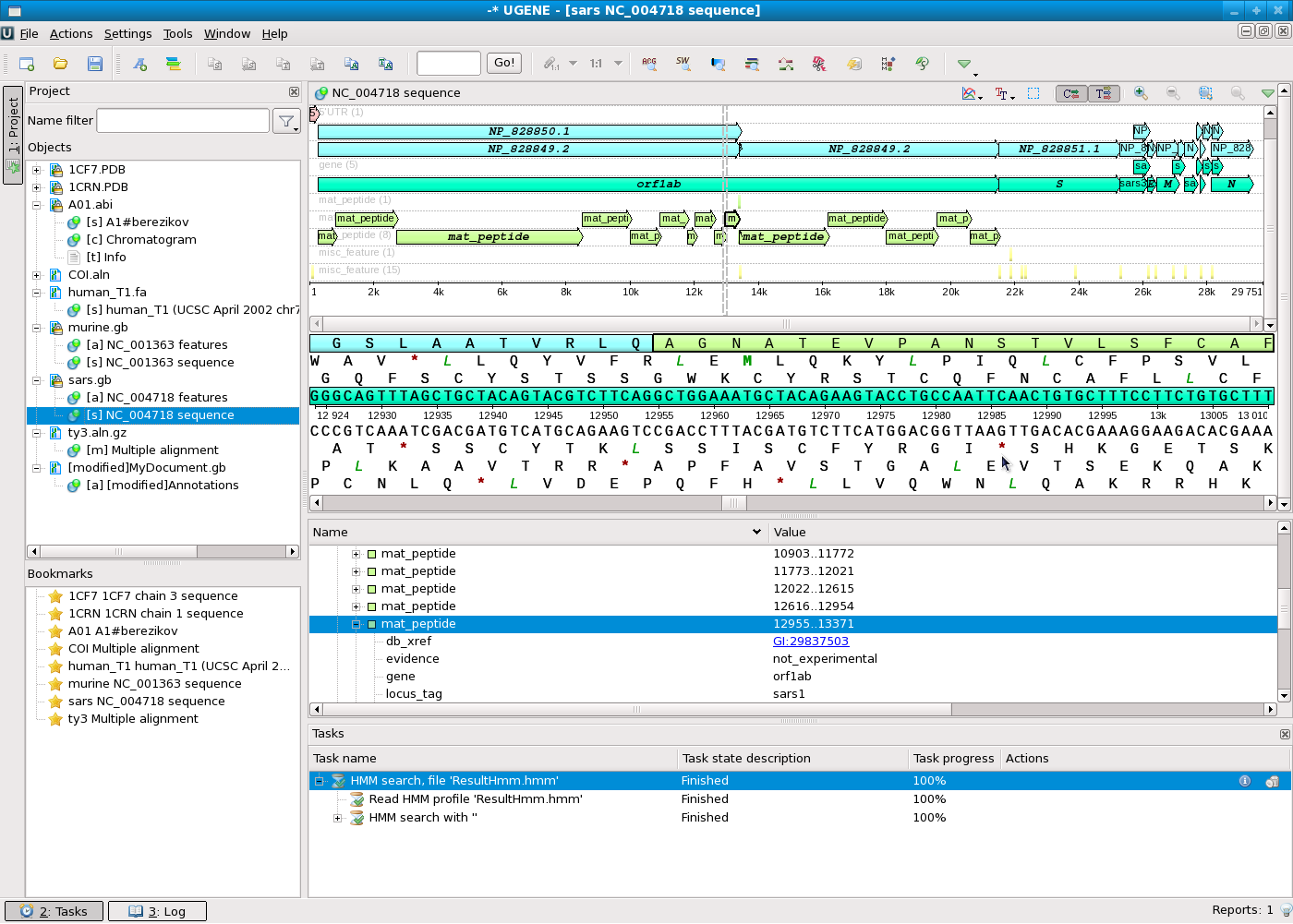
- Original author: Fursov M.
- Developer: Unipro
- Release: 2008; 18 years ago
- Stable release: 52.0 / 22 January 2025; 17 months ago
- Written in: C++, Qt
- Operating system: Windows, macOS, Linux
- Available in: English, Russian
- Type: Bioinformatics toolkit
- License: GPLv2
- Website: ugene.net

UGENE is computer software for bioinformatics. It helps biologists to analyze various biological genetics data, such as sequences, annotations, multiple alignments, phylogenetic trees, NGS assemblies, and others. UGENE integrates dozens of well-known biological tools, algorithms, and original tools in the context of genomics, evolutionary biology, virology, and other branches of life science.

UGENE works on personal computer operating systems such as Windows, macOS, or Linux. It is released as free and open-source software, under a GNU General Public License (GPL) version 2. The data can be stored both locally and on shared/networked storage. The graphical user interface (GUI) provides access to pre-built tools so users with no computer programming experience can access those tools easily. UGENE also has a command-line interface to execute Workflows.

Using UGENE Workflow Designer, it is possible to streamline a multi-step analysis. The workflow consists of blocks such as data readers, blocks executing embedded tools and algorithms, and data writers. Blocks can be created with command line tools or a script. A set of sample workflows is available in the Workflow Designer, to annotate sequences, convert data formats, analyze NGS data, etc.

To improve performance, UGENE uses multi-core processors (CPUs) and graphics processing units (GPUs) to optimize a few algorithms.

== Key features ==
The software supports the following features:

- Create, edit, and annotate nucleic acid and protein sequences
- Fast search in a sequence
- Multiple sequence alignment: Clustal W and O, MUSCLE, Kalign, MAFFT, T-Coffee
- Create and use shared storage, e.g., lab database
- Search through online databases: National Center for Biotechnology Information (NCBI), Protein Data Bank (PDB), UniProtKB/Swiss-Prot, UniProtKB/TrEMBL, DAS servers
- Local and NCBI Genbank BLAST search
- Open reading frame finder
- Restriction enzyme finder with integrated REBASE restriction enzymes list
- Integrated Primer3 package for PCR primer design
- Plasmid construction and annotation
- Cloning in silico by designing of cloning vectors
- Genome mapping of short reads with Bowtie, BWA, and UGENE Genome Aligner
- Visualize next generation sequencing data (BAM files) using UGENE Assembly Browser
- Variant calling with SAMtools
- RNA-Seq data analysis with Tuxedo pipeline (TopHat, Cufflinks, etc.)
- ChIP-seq data analysis with Cistrome pipeline (MACS, CEAS, etc.)
- Raw NGS data processing
- HMMER 2 and 3 packages integration
- Chromatogram viewer
- Search for transcription factor binding sites (TFBS) with weight matrix and SITECON algorithms
- Search for direct, inverted, and tandem repeats in DNA sequences
- Local sequence alignment with optimized Smith-Waterman algorithm
- Build (using integrated PHYLIP neighbor joining, MrBayes, or PhyML Maximum Likelihood) and edit phylogenetic trees
- Combine various algorithms into custom workflows with UGENE Workflow Designer
- Contigs assembly with CAP3
- 3D structure viewer for files in Protein Data Bank (PDB) and Molecular Modeling Database (MMDB) formats, anaglyph view support
- Predict protein secondary structure with GOR IV and PSIPRED algorithms
- Construct dot plots for nucleic acid sequences
- mRNA alignment with Spidey
- Search for complex signals with ExpertDiscovery
- Search for a pattern of various algorithms' results in a nucleic acid sequence with UGENE Query Designer
- PCR in silico for primer designing and mapping
- Spade de novo assembler

== Sequence View ==
The Sequence View is used to visualize, analyze and modify nucleic acid or protein sequences. Depending on the sequence type and the options selected, the following views can be present in the Sequence View window:

- 3D structure view
- Circular view
- Chromatogram view
- Graphs View: GC-content, AG-content, and other
- Dot plot view

== Alignment Editor ==
The Alignment Editor allows working with multiple nucleic acid or protein sequences - aligning them, editing the alignment, analyzing it, storing the consensus sequence, building a phylogenetic tree, and so on.

== Phylogenetic Tree Viewer ==
The Phylogenetic Tree Viewer helps to visualize and edit phylogenetic trees. It is possible to synchronize a tree with the corresponding multiple alignment used to build the tree.

== Assembly Browser ==
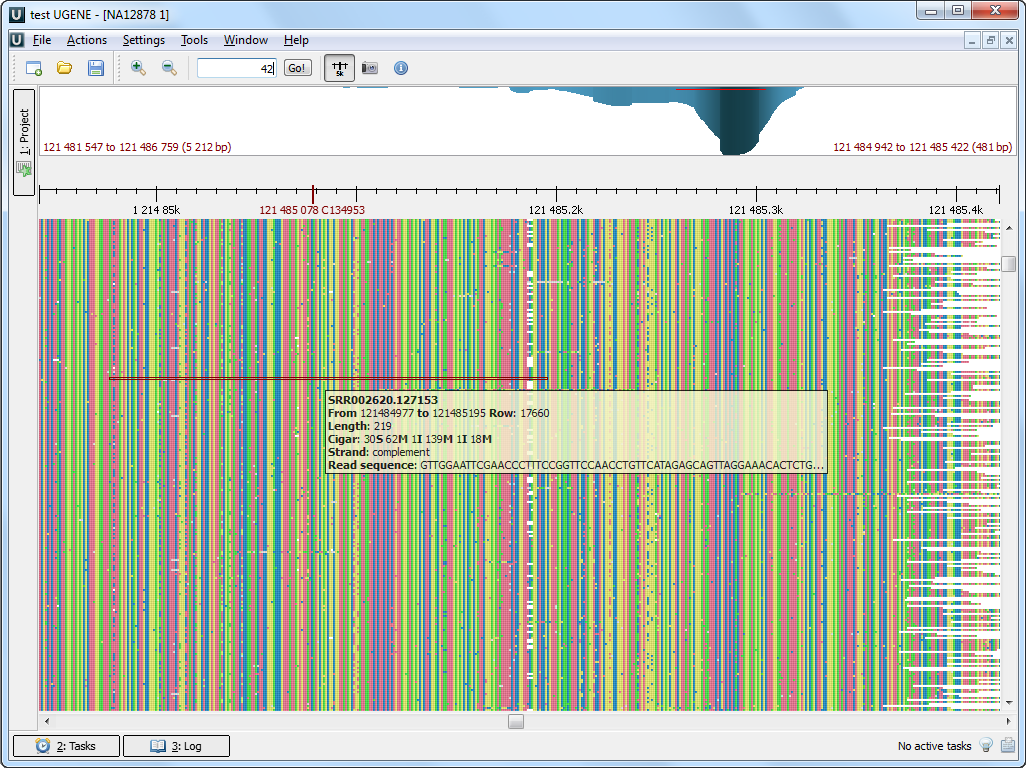
Assembly Browser

The Assembly Browser project was started in 2010 as an entry for Illumina iDEA Challenge 2011. The browser allows users to visualize and browse large (up to hundreds of millions of short reads) next generation sequence assemblies. It supports SAM, BAM (the binary version of SAM), and ACE formats. Before browsing assembly data in UGENE, an input file is converted to a UGENE database file automatically. This approach has its pros and cons. The pros are that this allows viewing the whole assembly, navigating in it, and going to well-covered regions rapidly. The cons are that a conversion may take time for a large file, and needs enough disk space to store the database.

== Workflow Designer ==
UGENE Workflow Designer allows creating and running complex computational workflow schemas.

The distinguishing feature of Workflow Designer, relative to other bioinformatics workflow management systems is that workflows are executed on a local computer. It helps to avoid data transfer issues, whereas other tools’ reliance on remote file storage and internet connectivity does not.

The elements that a workflow consists of correspond to the bulk of algorithms integrated into UGENE. Using Workflow Designer also allows creating custom workflow elements. The elements can be based on a command-line tool or a script.

Workflows are stored in a special text format. This allows their reuse, and transfer between users.

A workflow can be run using the graphical interface or launched from the command line. The graphical interface also allows controlling the workflow execution, storing the parameters, and so on.

There is an embedded library of workflow samples to convert, filter, and annotate data, with several pipelines to analyze NGS data developed in collaboration with NIH NIAID. A wizard is available for each workflow sample.

== Supported biological data formats ==
- Sequences and annotations: FASTA (.fa), GenBank (.gb), EMBL (.emb), GFF (.gff)
- Multiple sequence alignments: Clustal (.aln), MSF (.msf), Stockholm (.sto), Nexus (.nex)
- 3D structures: PDB (.pdb), MMDB (.prt)
- Chromatograms: ABIF (.abi), SCF (.scf)
- Short reads: Sequence Alignment/Map(SAM) (.sam), binary version of SAM (.bam), ACE (.ace), FASTQ (.fastq)
- Phylogenetic trees: Newick (.nwk), PHYLIP (.phy)
- Other formats: Bairoch (enzymes info), HMM (HMMER profiles), PWM and PFM (position matrices), SNP and VCF4 (genome variations)

== Release cycle ==
UGENE is primarily developed by Unipro LLC with headquarters in Akademgorodok of Novosibirsk, Russia. Each iteration lasts about 1–2 months, followed by a new release. Development snapshots may also be downloaded.

The features to include in each release are mostly initiated by users.

== See also ==
- Sequence alignment software
- Bioinformatics
- Computational biology
- List of open source bioinformatics software
