= ACE (genomic file format) =

The ACE file format is a specification for storing data about genomic contigs.

The original ACE format was developed for use with Consed, a program for viewing, editing, and finishing DNA sequence assemblies.

ACE files are generated by various assembly programs, including Phrap, CAP3, Newbler, Arachne, AMOS (more specifically Minimo) and Tigr Assembler v2.
