= Ladeana Hillier =

Ladeana Hillier is a biomedical engineer and computational biologist from the University of Washington. She was one of the earliest scientists involved in the Human Genome Project and is noted for her work in various branches of DNA sequencing, as well as for having co-developed Phred, a widely used DNA trace analyzer. Her multidisciplinary approach integrates Computational biology and Gene in her work, where she created a software to speed up sequencing. LaDeana W. Hillier performs integrative study on Gene expression and Regulation of gene expression. She also worked with the Children's Hospital Oakland Research Institute & Wellcome Trust Sanger Institute.

== See also ==
- Phred base calling
