= PANDIT (database) =

Content
- Description: protein and associated nucleotide domains with inferred trees.

Contact
- Research center: EMBL; European Bioinformatics Institute
- Primary citation: Whelan & al. (2006)
- Release date: 2006

Access
- Website: http://www.ebi.ac.uk/goldman-srv/pandit

Miscellaneous
- Version: 17.0(frozen since 2008)

PANDIT is a database of multiple sequence alignments and phylogenetic trees covering many common protein domains.

== See also ==
- Pfam: database of protein domains
- Phylogeny
- Sequence alignment
