= Phred (software) =

Phred (Phil's Read Editor) is a computer program for base calling, that is to say, identifying a nucleobase sequence from fluorescence "trace" data generated by an automated DNA sequencer that uses electrophoresis and 4-fluorescent dye method. When originally developed, Phred produced significantly fewer errors in the data sets examined than other methods, averaging 40–50% fewer errors. Phred quality scores have become widely accepted to characterize the quality of DNA sequences, and can be used to compare the efficacy of different sequencing methods.

== Background ==
The fluorescent-dye DNA sequencing is a molecular biology technique that involves labeling single-strand DNA sequences of varied length with 4 fluorescent dyes (corresponding to 4 different bases used in DNA) and subsequently separating the DNA sequences by "slab gel"- or capillary-electrophoresis method (see DNA Sequencing). The electrophoresis run is monitored by a CCD on the DNA sequencer and this produces a time "trace" data (or "chromatogram") of the fluorescent "peaks" that passed the CCD point. Examining the fluorescence peaks in the trace data, we can determine the order of individual bases (nucleobase) in the DNA. Since the intensity, shape and the location of a fluorescence peak are not always consistent or unambiguous, however, sometimes it is difficult or time-consuming to determine (or "call") the correct bases for the peaks accurately if it is done manually.

Automated DNA sequencing techniques have revolutionized the field of molecular biology – generating vast amounts of DNA sequence data. However, the sequence data is produced at a significantly higher rate than can be manually processed (i.e. interpreting the trace data to produce the sequence data), thereby creating a bottleneck. To remove the bottleneck, both automated software that can speed up the processing with improved accuracy and a reliable measure of the accuracy are needed. To meet this need, many software programs have been developed. One such program is Phred.

== History ==
Phred was originally conceived in the early 1990s by Phil Green, then a professor at Washington University in St. Louis. LaDeana Hillier, Michael Wendl, David Ficenec, Tim Gleeson, Alan Blanchard, and Richard Mott also contributed to the codebase and algorithm. Green moved to University of Washington in the mid 1990s, after which development was primarily managed by himself and Brent Ewing. Phred played a notable role in the Human Genome Project, where large amounts of sequence data were processed by automated scripts. It was at the time the most widely used base-calling software program by both academic and commercial DNA sequencing laboratories because of its high base calling accuracy. Phred is distributed commercially by CodonCode Corporation, and used to perform the "Call bases" function in the program CodonCode Aligner. It is also used by the MacVector plugin Assembler.

== Methods ==
Phred uses a four-phase procedure as outlined by Ewing et al. to determine a sequence of base calls from the processed DNA sequence tracing:

1. Predicted peak locations are determined, based on the assumption that fragments are relatively evenly spaced, on average, in most regions of the gel, to determine the correct number of bases and their idealized evenly spaced locations in regions where the peaks are not well resolved, noisy, or displaced (as in compressions)
2. Observed peaks are identified in the trace
3. Observed peaks are matched to the predicted peak locations, omitting some peaks and splitting others; as each observed peak comes from a specific array and is thus associated with 1 of the 4 bases (A, G, T, or C), the ordered list of matched observed peaks determines a base sequence for the trace.
4. The unmatched observed peaks are checked for any peak that appears to represent a base but could not be assigned to a predicted peak in the third phase and if found, the corresponding base is inserted into the read sequence.

The entire procedure is rapid, usually taking less than half a second per trace. The results can be output as a PHD file, which contains base data as triples consisting of the base call, quality, and position.

== Applications ==
Phred is often used together with another software program called Phrap, which is a program for DNA sequence assembly. Phrap was routinely used in some of the largest sequencing projects in the Human Genome Sequencing Project and is currently one of the most widely used DNA sequence assembly programs in the biotech industry. Phrap uses Phred quality scores to determine highly accurate consensus sequences and to estimate the quality of the consensus sequences. Phrap also uses Phred quality scores to estimate whether discrepancies between two overlapping sequences are more likely to arise from random errors, or from different copies of a repeated sequence.
