= Probalign =

Probalign is a sequence alignment tool that calculates a maximum expected accuracy alignment using partition function posterior probabilities. Base pair probabilities are estimated using an estimate similar to the Boltzmann distribution. The partition function is calculated using a dynamic programming approach.

== Algorithm ==
The following describes the algorithm used by probalign to determine the base pair probabilities.

=== Alignment score ===
To score an alignment of two sequences two things are needed:

- a similarity function $\sigma(x,y)$ (e.g. PAM, BLOSUM,...)
- affine gap penalty: $g(k) = \alpha + \beta k$

The score $S(a)$ of an alignment a is defined as:

$S(a) = \sum_{x_i-y_j \in a} \sigma(x_i,y_j) + \text{gap cost}$

Now the boltzmann weighted score of an alignment a is:

$e^{\frac{S(a)}{T}} = e^{\frac{\sum_{x_i-y_j \in a} \sigma(x_i,y_j) + \text{gap cost}}{T}} = \left( \prod_{x_i - y_i \in a} e^{\frac{\sigma(x_i,y_j)}{T}} \right) \cdot e^{\frac{gapcost}{T}}$

Where $T$ is a scaling factor.

The probability of an alignment assuming boltzmann distribution is given by

$Pr[a|x,y] = \frac{e^{\frac{S(a)}{T}}}{Z}$

Where $Z$ is the partition function, i.e. the sum of the boltzmann weights of all alignments.

=== Dynamic programming ===
Let $Z_{i,j}$ denote the partition function of the prefixes $x_0,x_1,...,x_i$ and $y_0,y_1,...,y_j$. Three different cases are considered:

1. $Z^{M}_{i,j}:$ the partition function of all alignments of the two prefixes that end in a match.
2. $Z^{I}_{i,j}:$ the partition function of all alignments of the two prefixes that end in an insertion $(-,y_j)$.
3. $Z^{D}_{i,j}:$ the partition function of all alignments of the two prefixes that end in a deletion $(x_i,-)$.

Then we have: $Z_{i,j} = Z^{M}_{i,j} + Z^{D}_{i,j} + Z^{I}_{i,j}$

==== Initialization ====
The matrixes are initialized as follows:

- $Z^{M}_{0,j} = Z^{M}_{i,0} = 0$
- $Z^{M}_{0,0} = 1$
- $Z^{D}_{0,j} = 0$
- $Z^{I}_{i,0} = 0$

==== Recursion ====
The partition function for the alignments of two sequences $x$ and $y$ is given by $Z_{|x|,|y|}$, which can be recursively computed:

- $Z^{M}_{i,j} = Z_{i-1,j-1} \cdot e^{\frac{\sigma(x_i,y_j)}{T}}$
- $Z^{D}_{i,j} = Z^{D}_{i-1,j} \cdot e^{\frac{\beta}{T}} + Z^{M}_{i-1,j} \cdot e^{\frac{g(1)}{T}} + Z^{I}_{i-1,j} \cdot e^{\frac{g(1)}{T}}$
- $Z^{I}_{i,j}$ analogously

=== Base pair probability ===
Finally the probability that positions $x_i$ and $y_j$ form a base pair is given by:

$P(x_i - y_j|x,y) = \frac{Z_{i-1,j-1} \cdot e^{\frac{\sigma(x_i,y_j)}{T}} \cdot Z'_{i',j'}}{Z_{|x|,|y|}}$

$Z', i', j'$ are the respective values for the recalculated $Z$ with inversed base pair strings.

== See also ==
- ProbCons
- Multiple Sequence Alignment
