= AMAP =

- Developers: Ariel Schwartz (UC Berkeley), Lior Pachter (UC Berkeley)
- Stable release: 2.0
- Operating system: UNIX, Linux, Mac
- Type: Bioinformatics tool
- Licence: Open source
- Website: AMAP download

AMAP is a multiple sequence alignment program based on sequence annealing. This approach consists of building up the multiple alignment one match at a time, thereby circumventing many of the problems of progressive alignment. The AMAP parameters can be used to tune the sensitivity-specificity tradeoff.

The program can be used through the AMAP web server or as a standalone program which can be installed with the source code.

== Input/Output ==
This program accepts sequences in FASTA format.

The output format includes: FASTA format, Clustal.
