= Protein Information Resource =

The Protein Information Resource (PIR), located at Georgetown University Medical Center, is an integrated public bioinformatics resource to support genomic and proteomic research, and scientific studies. It contains protein sequences databases

== History ==
PIR was established in 1984 by the National Biomedical Research Foundation as a resource to assist researchers and customers in the identification and interpretation of protein sequence information. Prior to that, the foundation compiled the first comprehensive collection of macromolecular sequences in the Atlas of Protein Sequence and Structure, published from 1964 to 1974 under the editorship of Margaret Dayhoff. Dayhoff and her research group pioneered in the development of computer methods for the comparison of protein sequences, for the detection of distantly related sequences and duplications within sequences, and for the inference of evolutionary histories from alignments of protein sequences.

Winona Barker and Robert Ledley assumed leadership of the project after the death of Dayhoff in 1983. In 1999, Cathy H. Wu joined the National Biomedical Research Foundation, and later on Georgetown University Medical Center, to head the bioinformatics efforts of PIR, and has served first as Principal Investigator and, since 2001, as Director.

For four decades, PIR has provided many protein databases and analysis tools freely accessible to the scientific community, including the Protein Sequence Database, the first international database (see PIR-International), which grew out of Atlas of Protein Sequences and Structure.

In 2002, PIR – along with its international partners, the European Bioinformatics Institute and the Swiss Institute of Bioinformatics – were awarded a grant from NIH to create UniProt, a single worldwide database of protein sequence and function, by unifying the Protein Information Resource-Protein Sequence Database, Swiss-Prot, and TrEMBL databases. As of 2010, PIR offers a wide variety of resources mainly oriented to assist the propagation and standardization of protein annotation: PIRSF, iProClass, and iProLINK.

The Protein Ontology is another popular database released by the Protein Information Resource.
