= Gene Codes Corporation =

Bioinformatics company in Michigan, US

- Company type: Privately held
- Industry: Bioinformatics and Engineering
- Founded: 1988
- Headquarters: Ann Arbor, MI, USA
- Key people: Howard Cash; President and CEO
- Products: DNA Sequence Analysis Tools
- Website: www.genecodes.com

Gene Codes Corporation is Michigan company based in Ann Arbor which specializes in bioinformatics software for genetic sequence analysis. Most notably, after the 9/11 attacks, it contributed to the identification of more than a thousand victims.

== History ==
Gene Codes Corporation was founded in 1988 in Ann Arbor, Michigan. In 1991, its flagship software product, Sequencher, was released. Sequencher 5.4 was released in 2015.

== Awards and Recognitions ==
- The International Society for Computational Biology recognizes Howard Cash and Gene Codes Forensics for the unique application of computational biology to help with disaster victim identification. ISCB President Michael Gribskov called Gene Codes' contribution "unique, valuable, and beyond the limit of what could be expected".
- Ann Arbor IT Zone recognizes Gene Codes Corporation with the Indestructible Award for Growth and Achievement.
- Gene Codes is awarded the Merlanti Prize for Best Practices in Business Ethics.
- Genome Technology makes Howard Cash Person of the Year in their All-Star Awards.
- Gene Codes Corporation is named one of the Future 50 of Greater Detroit: "In recognition of your outstanding contribution to Metropolitan Detroit through sales and employment growth."
- Ernst & Young and The New Enterprise Forum name Howard Cash, President, CEO and founder of Gene Codes, Entrepreneur of the Year.
- Gene Codes wins the Washtenaw County Fast Track Award.
- Sequencher receives the Best DNA Sequence Assembly Product from the Biotechnology Software & Internet Journal.
- Gene Codes receives Michigan Leading Edge Technology Award in the biotechnology category. The award recognizes innovations introduced with Sequencher version 3.0, giving special mention to enhancements that allowed increased process automation.
- Gene Codes receives the Best Presentation of the Year award by the Michigan Branch of the New Enterprise Forum: "In recognition of an innovative business venture which has helped make Gene Codes Corporation a model entrepreneurial firm."
