= Phrap =

Phrap is a widely used program for DNA sequence assembly. It is part of the Phred-Phrap-Consed package.

== History ==
Phrap was originally developed by Prof. Phil Green for the assembly of cosmids in large-scale cosmid shotgun sequencing within the Human Genome Project. Phrap has been widely used for many different sequence assembly projects, including bacterial genome assemblies and EST assemblies.

Phrap was written as a command line program for easy integration into automated data workflows in genome sequencing centers. For users who want to use Phrap from a graphical interface, the commercial programs MacVector (for Mac OS X only) and CodonCode Aligner (for Mac OS X and Microsoft Windows) are available.

== Methods ==
A detailed (albeit partially outdated) description of the Phrap algorithms can be found in the Phrap documentation. A recurring thread within the Phrap algorithms is the use of Phred quality scores. Phrap used quality scores to mitigate a problem that other assembly programs had struggled with at the beginning of the Human Genome Project: correctly assembling frequent imperfect repeats, in particular Alu sequences. Phrap uses quality scores to tell if any observed differences in repeated regions are likely to be due to random ambiguities in the sequencing process, or more likely to be due to the sequences being from different copies of the Alu repeat. Typically, Phrap had no problems differentiating between the different Alu copies in a cosmid, and to correctly assemble the cosmids (or, later, BACs). The logic is simple: a base call with a high probability of being correct should never be aligned with another high quality but different base. However, Phrap does not rule out such alignments entirely, and the cross_match alignment gap and alignment penalties used while looking for local alignments are not always optimal for typical sequencing errors and a search for overlapping (contiguous) sequences. (Affine gaps are helpful for homology searches but not usually for sequencing error alignment). Phrap attempts to classify chimeras, vector sequences and low quality end regions all in a single alignment and will sometimes make mistakes. Furthermore, Phrap has more than one round of assembly building internally and later rounds are less stringent - Greedy algorithm.

These design choices were helpful in the 1990s when the program was originally written (at Washington University in St. Louis) but are less so now. Phrap appears error prone in comparison with newer assemblers like Euler and cannot use mate-pair information directly to guide assembly and assemble past perfect repeats. Phrap is not free software so it has not been extended and enhanced like less restricted open-source software Sequence assembly.

== Quality based consensus sequences ==
Another use of Phred quality scores by Phrap that contributed to the program's success was the determination of consensus sequences using sequence qualities. In effect, Phrap automated a step that was a major bottleneck in the early phases of the Human Genome Project: to determine the correct consensus sequence at all positions where the assembled sequences had discrepant bases. This approach had been suggested by Bonfield and Staden in 1995, and was implemented and further optimized in Phrap. Basically, at any consensus position with discrepant bases, Phrap examines the quality scores of the aligned sequences to find the highest quality sequence. In the process, Phrap takes confirmation of local sequence by other reads into account, after considering direction and sequencing chemistry.

The mathematics of this approach were rather simple, since Phred quality scores are logarithmically linked to error probabilities. This means that the quality scores of confirming reads can simply be added, as long as the error distributions are sufficiently independent. To satisfy this independence criterion, reads must typically be in different direction, since peak patterns that cause base calling errors are often identical when a region is sequenced several times in the same direction.

If a consensus base is covered by both high-quality sequence and (discrepant) low-quality sequence, Phrap's selection of the higher quality sequence will in most cases be correct. Phrap then assigns the confirmed base quality to the consensus sequence base. This makes it easy to (a) find consensus regions that are not covered by high quality sequence (which will also have low quality), and (b) to quickly calculate a reasonably accurate estimate of the error rate of the consensus sequence. This information can then be used to direct finishing efforts, for example re-sequencing of problem regions.

The combination of accurate, base-specific quality scores and a quality-based consensus sequence was a critical element in the success of the Human Genome Project. Phred and Phrap, and similar programs who picked up on the ideas pioneered by these two programs, enabled the assembly of large parts of the human genome (and many other genomes) at an accuracy that was substantially higher (less than 1 error in 10,000 bases) than the typical accuracy of carefully hand-edited sequences that had been submitted to the GenBank database before.

== Other Software ==
- Phred
- Consed
- DNA Baser Command Line Tool
