= CodonCode Aligner =

DNA sequence software

- Developer: CodonCode Corporation
- Stable release: 12.0.1 / 2024
- Operating system: Mac OS X, Windows
- Type: Bioinformatics
- License: commercial; free for limited use (trace viewing & editing)
- Website: http://www.codoncode.com/aligner

CodonCode Aligner is a commercial application for DNA sequence assembly, sequence alignment, and editing on Mac OS X and Windows.

== Features ==
Features include chromatogram editing, end clipping, and vector trimming, sequence assembly and contig editing, aligning cDNA against genomic templates, sequence alignment and editing, alignment of contigs to each other with ClustalW, MUSCLE, or built-in algorithms, mutation detection, including detection of heterozygous single-nucleotide polymorphism, analysis of heterozygous insertions and deletions, start online BLAST searches, restriction analysis (find and view restriction cut sites), RFLP analysis, virtual cloning, including Gibson Assembly, restriction cloning, and TA and TOPO cloning, primer design, phylogenetic trees, difference tables, trace sharpening, and support for Phred, Phrap, ClustalW, and MUSCLE.

== History ==
The first beta version of CodonCode Aligner was released in April 2003, followed by the first full version in June 2003. Major upgrades were released in 2003, 2004, 2006, 2007, 2009, 2010, 2012, 2013, 2014, 2015, 2017, 2018, 2019, 2021, 2023, and 2024.

In April 2009, CodonCode Aligner had been cited in more than 400 scientific publications. In 2025 CodonCode Aligner has been cited in thousands of peer-reviewed scientific publications. Citations cover a wide variety of biomedical research areas, including HIV research, biogeography and environmental biology, DNA methylation studies, genetic diseases, clinical microbiology, and evolution research and phylogenetics.

== See also ==
- Phred base calling
- Phrap
- Consed
