= Consed =

- Developer(s): David Gordon
- Operating system: UNIX, Linux, Mac OS X
- Type: Bioinformatics
- License: Proprietary
- Website: http://bozeman.mbt.washington.edu/consed/consed.html

Consed is a program for viewing, editing, and finishing DNA sequence assemblies. Originally developed for sequence assemblies created with phrap, recent versions also support other sequence assembly programs like Newbler.

== History ==
Consed was originally developed as a contig editing and finishing tool for large-scale cosmid shotgun sequencing in the Human Genome Project. At genome sequencing centers, Consed was used to check assemblies generated by phrap, solve assembly problems like those caused by highly identical repeats, and finishing tasks like primer picking and gap closure. Development of Consed has continued after the completion of the Human Genome Project. Current Consed versions support very large projects with millions of reads, enabling the use with newer sequencing methods like 454 sequencing and Solexa sequencing. Consed also has advanced tools for finishing tasks like automated primer picking

== See also ==
- Phred
- Phrap
