= List of RNA structure prediction software =

This list of RNA structure prediction software is a compilation of software tools and web portals used for nucleic acid structure prediction.

== Single sequence secondary structure prediction. ==
Name	Description	Knots (Note: Knots: Pseudoknot prediction, <yes|no>.)	Links	References
CentroidFold	Secondary structure prediction based on generalized centroid estimator	No	sourcecode webserver	
CentroidHomfold	Secondary structure prediction by using homologous sequence information	No	sourcecode webserver	
Context Fold	An RNA secondary structure prediction software based on feature-rich trained scoring models.	No	sourcecode webserver	
CONTRAfold	Secondary structure prediction method based on conditional log-linear models (CLLMs), a flexible class of probabilistic models which generalize upon SCFGs by using discriminative training and feature-rich scoring.	No	sourcecode webserver	
Crumple	Software that produces a full set of possible secondary structures for a given sequence, using optional constraints.	No	sourcecode	
CyloFold	Secondary structure prediction method based on placement of helices allowing complex pseudoknots.	Yes	webserver	
E2Efold	A deep learning based method for efficiently predicting secondary structure by differentiating through a constrained optimization solver, without using dynamic programming.	Yes	sourcecode	
EternaFold	A multitask-learning-based model trained on data from the Eterna project.	No	sourcecode webserver	
GTFold	Fast and scalable multicore code for predicting RNA secondary structure.	No	link sourcecode	
INTERPIN	Algorithm and database for prediction of transcription termination sites in bacteria. Uses Mfold for RNA secondary structure prediction.	No	webserver	
IPknot	Fast and accurate prediction of RNA secondary structures with pseudoknots using integer programming.	Yes	sourcecode webserver	
KineFold	Folding kinetics of RNA sequences including pseudoknots by including an implementation of the partition function for knots.	Yes	linuxbinary, webserver	
Mfold	MFE (Minimum Free Energy) RNA structure prediction algorithm.	No	sourcecode, webserver	
pKiss	A dynamic programming algorithm for the prediction of a restricted class (H-type and kissing hairpins) of RNA pseudoknots.	Yes	sourcecode, webserver	
Pknots	A dynamic programming algorithm for optimal RNA pseudoknot prediction using the nearest neighbour energy model.	Yes	sourcecode	
PknotsRG	A dynamic programming algorithm for the prediction of a restricted class (H-type) of RNA pseudoknots.	Yes	sourcecode, webserver	
RNA123	Secondary structure prediction via thermodynamic-based folding algorithms and novel structure-based sequence alignment specific for RNA.	Yes	webserver	
SQUARNA	Secondary structure prediction via stem maximization	Yes	sourcecode webserver	
RNAfold	MFE RNA structure prediction algorithm. Includes an implementation of the partition function for computing basepair probabilities and circular RNA folding.	No	sourcecode, webserver	
RNAshapes	MFE RNA structure prediction based on abstract shapes. Shape abstraction retains adjacency and nesting of structural features, but disregards helix lengths, thus reduces the number of suboptimal solutions without losing significant information. Furthermore, shapes represent classes of structures for which probabilities based on Boltzmann-weighted energies can be computed.	No	source & binaries, webserver	
RNAstructure	A program to predict lowest free energy structures and base pair probabilities for RNA or DNA sequences. Programs are also available to predict maximum expected accuracy structures and these can include pseudoknots. Structure prediction can be constrained using experimental data, including SHAPE, enzymatic cleavage, and chemical modification accessibility. Graphical user interfaces are available for Windows, Mac OS X, Linux. Programs are also available for use with Unix-style text interfaces. Also, a C++ class library is available.	Yes	source & binaries, webserver	
SARNA-Predict	RNA Secondary structure prediction method based on simulated annealing. It can also predict structure with pseudoknots.	Yes	link	
seqfold	Predict the minimum free energy structure of nucleic acids. seqfold is an implementation of the Zuker, 1981 dynamic programming algorithm, the basis for UNAFold/mfold, with energy functions from SantaLucia, 2004 (DNA) and Turner, 2009 (RNA). MIT license. Python CLI or module.	No	link & source	
Sfold	Statistical sampling of all possible structures. The sampling is weighted by partition function probabilities.	No	Github_Repository	
Sliding Windows & Assembly	Sliding windows and assembly is a tool chain for folding long series of similar hairpins.	No	sourcecode	
SPOT-RNA	SPOT-RNA is first RNA secondary structure predictor which can predict all kind base pairs (canonical, noncanonical, pseudoknots, and base triplets).	Yes	sourcecode webserver	
SwiSpot	Command-line utility for predicting alternative (secondary) configurations of riboswitches. It is based on the prediction of the so-called switching sequence, to subsequently constrain the folding of the two functional structures.	No	sourcecode	
UFold	UFold: fast and accurate RNA secondary structure prediction with deep learning	Yes	sourcecode, webserver	
UNAFold	Command-line utility for predicting alternative (secondary) configurations of riboswitches. It is based on the prediction of the so-called switching sequence, to subsequently constrain the folding of the two functional structures.	No	sourcecode	
vsfold/vs subopt	Folds and predicts RNA secondary structure and pseudoknots using an entropy model derived from polymer physics. The program vs_subopt computes suboptimal structures based on the free energy landscape derived from vsfold5.	Yes	webserver	

== Single sequence tertiary structure prediction ==
Name	Description	Knots (Note: Knots: Pseudoknot prediction, <yes|no>.)	Links	References
trRosettaRNA	trRosettaRNA is an algorithm for automated prediction of RNA 3D structure. It builds the RNA structure by Rosetta energy minimization, with deep learning restraints from a transformer network (RNAformer). trRosettaRNA has been validated in blind tests, including CASP15 and RNA-Puzzles, which suggests that the automated predictions by trRosettaRNA are competitive to the predictions by the top human groups on natural RNAs.	Yes	webserver sourcecode	
BARNACLE	A Python library for the probabilistic sampling of RNA structures that are compatible with a given nucleotide sequence and that are RNA-like on a local length scale.	Yes	sourcecode	
FARFAR2	Automated de novo prediction of native-like RNA tertiary structures .	Yes	webserver	
iFoldRNA	three-dimensional RNA structure prediction and folding	Yes	webserver	
MC-Fold MC-Sym Pipeline	Thermodynamics and Nucleotide cyclic motifs for RNA structure prediction algorithm. 2D and 3D structures.	Yes	sourcecode, webserver	
NAST	Coarse-grained modeling of large RNA molecules with knowledge-based potentials and structural filters	Unknown	executables	
NuFold	A deep learning-based tertiary structure prediction method built upon AlphaFold 2 architecture. Utilizes flexible nucleobase center representation and metagenomic multiple sequence alignment to further predictions.	Yes	executables	
MMB	Turning limited experimental information into 3D models of RNA	Unknown	sourcecode	
RNA123	Integrated platform for de novo and homology modeling of RNA 3D structures, where coordinate file input, sequence editing, sequence alignment, structure prediction and analysis features are all accessed from one intuitive graphical user interface.	Yes		
RNAComposer	Fully automated prediction of large RNA 3D structures.	Yes	webserver webserver	

== Comparative methods ==
The single sequence methods mentioned above have a difficult job detecting a small sample of reasonable secondary structures from a large space of possible structures. A good way to reduce the size of the space is to use evolutionary approaches. Structures that have been conserved by evolution are far more likely to be the functional form. The methods below use this approach.

Name	Description	Number of sequences (Note: Number of sequences: <any|num>.)	Alignment (Note: Alignment: predicts an alignment, <input|yes|no>.)	Structure (Note: Structure: predicts structure, <input|yes|no>.)	Knots (Note: Knots: Pseudoknot prediction, <yes|no>.)	Link	References
SQUARNA	Common secondary structure prediction based on a greedy stem formation model	any	No	Yes	Yes	sourcecode webserver	
Carnac	Comparative analysis combined with MFE folding.	any	No	Yes	No	sourcecode, webserver	
CentroidAlifold	Common secondary structure prediction based on generalized centroid estimator	any	No	Yes	No	sourcecode	
CentroidAlign	Fast and accurate multiple aligner for RNA sequences	any	Yes	No	No	sourcecode	
CMfinder	an expectation maximization algorithm using covariance models for motif description. Uses heuristics for effective motif search, and a Bayesian framework for structure prediction combining folding energy and sequence covariation.	$3\le seqs \le60$	Yes	Yes	No	sourcecode, webserver, website	
CONSAN	implements a pinned Sankoff algorithm for simultaneous pairwise RNA alignment and consensus structure prediction.	2	Yes	Yes	No	sourcecode	
DAFS	Simultaneous aligning and folding of RNA sequences via dual decomposition.	any	Yes	Yes	Yes	sourcecode	
Dynalign	an algorithm that improves the accuracy of structure prediction by combining free energy minimization and comparative sequence analysis to find a low free energy structure common to two sequences without requiring any sequence identity.	2	Yes	Yes	No	sourcecode	
Foldalign	An algorithm capable of making both local and global pairwise structural alignments of RNAs. Based on a combination of energy minimization of the conserved structure and sequence similarity using ribosum-like scoring matrices. For local alignments more than one alignment can be returned.	2	Yes	Yes	No	sourcecode, webserver website	
FoldalignM	A multiple RNA structural RNA alignment method, to a large extent based on the PMcomp program.	any	Yes	Yes	No	sourcecode	
FRUUT	A pairwise RNA structural alignment tool based on the comparison of RNA trees. Considers alignments in which the compared trees can be rooted differently (with respect to the standard "external loop" corresponding roots), and/or permuted with respect to branching order.	any	Yes	input	No	sourcecode, webserver	
GraphClust	Fast RNA structural clustering method of local RNA secondary structures. Predicted clusters are refined using LocARNA and CMsearch. Due to the linear time complexity for clustering it is possible to analyse large RNA datasets.	any	Yes	Yes	No	sourcecode	
KNetFold	Computes a consensus RNA secondary structure from an RNA sequence alignment based on machine learning.	any	input	Yes	Yes	linuxbinary, webserver	
LARA	Produce a global fold and alignment of ncRNA families using integer linear programming and Lagrangian relaxation.	any	Yes	Yes	No	sourcecode	
LocaRNA	LocaRNA is the successor of PMcomp with an improved time complexity. It is a variant of Sankoff's algorithm for simultaneous folding and alignment, which takes as input pre-computed base pair probability matrices from McCaskill's algorithm as produced by RNAfold -p. Thus the method can also be viewed as way to compare base pair probability matrices.	any	Yes	Yes	No	sourcecode, webserver	
MASTR	A sampling approach using Markov chain Monte Carlo in a simulated annealing framework, where both structure and alignment is optimized by making small local changes. The score combines the log-likelihood of the alignment, a covariation term and the basepair probabilities.	any	Yes	Yes	No	sourcecode	
Multilign	This method uses multiple Dynalign calculations to find a low free energy structure common to any number of sequences. It does not require any sequence identity.	any	Yes	Yes	No	sourcecode	
Murlet	a multiple alignment tool for RNA sequences using iterative alignment based on Sankoff's algorithm with sharply reduced computational time and memory.	any	Yes	Yes	No	webserver	
MXSCARNA	a multiple alignment tool for RNA sequences using progressive alignment based on pairwise structural alignment algorithm of SCARNA.	any	Yes	Yes	No	webserver sourcecode	
pAliKiss	pAliKiss predicts RNA secondary structures for fixed RNA multiple sequence alignments, with special attention for pseudoknotted structures. This program is an offspring of the hybridization of RNAalishapes and pKiss.	any	input	Yes	Yes	webserver sourcecode	
PARTS	A method for joint prediction of alignment and common secondary structures of two RNA sequences using a probabilistic model based on pseudo free energies obtained from precomputed base pairing and alignment probabilities.	2	Yes	Yes	No	sourcecode	
Pfold	Folds alignments using a SCFG trained on rRNA alignments.	$\le40$	input	Yes	No	webserver	
PETfold	Formally integrates both the energy-based and evolution-based approaches in one model to predict the folding of multiple aligned RNA sequences by a maximum expected accuracy scoring. The structural probabilities are calculated by RNAfold and Pfold.	any	input	Yes	No	sourcecode	
PhyloQFold	Method that takes advantage of the evolutionary history of a group of aligned RNA sequences for sampling consensus secondary structures, including pseudoknots, according to their approximate posterior probability.	any	input	Yes	Yes	sourcecode	
PMcomp/PMmulti	PMcomp is a variant of Sankoff's algorithm for simultaneous folding and alignment, which takes as input pre-computed base pair probability matrices from McCaskill's algorithm as produced by RNAfold -p. Thus the method can also be viewed as way to compare base pair probability matrices. PMmulti is a wrapper program that does progressive multiple alignments by repeatedly calling pmcomp	$2\le seqs \le6$	Yes	Yes	No	sourcecode, webserver	
RNAG	A Gibbs sampling method to determine a conserved structure and the structural alignment.	any	Yes	Yes	No	sourcecode	
R-COFFEE	uses RNAlpfold to compute the secondary structure of the provided sequences. A modified version of T-Coffee is then used to compute the multiple sequence alignment having the best agreement with the sequences and the structures. R-Coffee can be combined with any existing sequence alignment method.	any	Yes	Yes	No	sourcecode, webserver	
TurboFold	This algorithm predicts conserved structures in any number of sequences. It uses probabilistic alignment and partition functions to map conserved pairs between sequences, and then iterates the partition functions to improve structure prediction accuracy	any	No	Yes	Yes	sourcecode	
R-scape	Verify conserved secondary structure by measuring covarying basepairs and their statistical significance compared to pure phylogeny. Will propose a most conserved ("optimized") one if no secondary structure is given.	any	input	Yes	Yes	home page	
RNA123	Included structure based sequence alignment (SBSA) algorithm uses a novel suboptimal version of the Needleman-Wunsch global sequence alignment method that fully accounts for secondary structure in the template and query. It also uses two separate substitution matrices optimized for RNA helices and single stranded regions. The SBSA algorithm provides >90% accurate sequence alignments even for structures as large as bacterial 23S rRNA: ~2,800 nts.	any	Yes	Yes	Yes	webserver	
RNAalifold	Folds precomputed alignments using mix of free-energy and covariation measures. Ships with the ViennaRNA Package.	any	input	Yes	No	homepage	
RNAalishapes	Tool for secondary structure prediction for precomputed alignments using a mix of free-energy and a covariation measures. Output can be sifted by the abstract shapes concept to focus on major difference in suboptimal results.	any	input	Yes	No	sourcecode, webserver	
RNAcast	enumerates the near-optimal abstract shape space, and predicts as the consensus an abstract shape common to all sequences, and for each sequence, the thermodynamically best structure which has this abstract shape.	any	No	Yes	No	sourcecode, webserver	
RNAforester	Compare and align RNA secondary structures via a "forest alignment" approach.	any	Yes	input	No	sourcecode, webserver	
RNAmine	Frequent stem pattern miner from unaligned RNA sequences is a software tool to extract the structural motifs from a set of RNA sequences.	any	No	Yes	No	webserver	
RNASampler	A probabilistic sampling approach that combines intrasequence base pairing probabilities with intersequence base alignment probabilities. This is used to sample possible stems for each sequence and compare these stems between all pairs of sequences to predict a consensus structure for two sequences. The method is extended to predict the common structure conserved among multiple sequences by using a consistency-based score that incorporates information from all the pairwise structural alignments.	any	Yes	Yes	Yes	sourcecode	
SCARNA	Stem Candidate Aligner for RNA (Scarna) is a fast, convenient tool for structural alignment of a pair of RNA sequences. It aligns two RNA sequences and calculates the similarities of them, based on the estimated common secondary structures. It works even for pseudoknotted secondary structures.	2	Yes	Yes	No	webserver	
SimulFold	simultaneously inferring RNA structures including pseudoknots, alignments, and trees using a Bayesian MCMC framework.	any	Yes	Yes	Yes	sourcecode	
Stemloc	a program for pairwise RNA structural alignment based on probabilistic models of RNA structure known as Pair stochastic context-free grammars.	any	Yes	Yes	No	sourcecode	
StrAl	an alignment tool designed to provide multiple alignments of non-coding RNAs following a fast progressive strategy. It combines the thermodynamic base pairing information derived from RNAfold calculations in the form of base pairing probability vectors with the information of the primary sequence.	$\le50$	Yes	No	No	sourcecode, webserver	
TFold	A tool for predicting non-coding RNA secondary structures including pseudoknots. It takes in input an alignment of RNA sequences and returns the predicted secondary structure(s). It combines criteria of stability, conservation and covariation in order to search for stems and pseudoknots. Users can change different parameters values, set (or not) some known stems (if there are) which are taken into account by the system, choose to get several possible structures or only one, search for pseudoknots or not, etc.	any	Yes	Yes	Yes	webserver	
WAR	a webserver that makes it possible to simultaneously use a number of state of the art methods for performing multiple alignment and secondary structure prediction for noncoding RNA sequences.	$2\le seqs \le50$	Yes	Yes	No	webserver	
Xrate	a program for analysis of multiple sequence alignments using phylogenetic grammars, that may be viewed as a flexible generalization of the "Pfold" program.	any	Yes	Yes	No	sourcecode	
Alifreefold/AlifreefoldMulti	an alignment-free approach to predict secondary structure from homologous RNA sequences. It computes a representative structure from a set of homologous RNA sequences using sub-optimal secondary structures generated for each sequence. It is based on a vector representation of sub-optimal structures capturing structure conservation signals by weighting structural motifs according to their conservation across the sub-optimal structures.	>5	No	Yes	No	sourcecodesourcecode webserver	

== RNA solvent accessibility prediction ==
Name (Year)	Description	Link	References
RNAsnap2 (2020)	RNAsnap2 uses a dilated convolutional neural network with evolutionary features generated from BLAST + INFERNAL (same as RNAsol) and predicted base-pairing probabilities from LinearPartition as an input for the prediction of RNA solvent accessibility. Also, the single-sequence version of RNAsnap2 can predict the solvent accessibility of a given input RNA sequence without using evolutionary information.	sourcecode webserver	
RNAsol (2019)	RNAsol predictor uses a unidirectional LSTM deep learning algorithm with evolutionary information generated from BLASTN + INFERNAL and predicted secondary structure from RNAfold as an input for the prediction of RNA solvent accessibility.	sourcecode webserver	
RNAsnap (2017)	RNAsnap predictor uses an SVM machine learning algorithm and evolutionary information generated from BLASTN as an input for the prediction of RNA solvent accessibility.	sourcecode	

== Intermolecular interactions: RNA-RNA ==
Many ncRNAs function by binding to other RNAs. For example, miRNAs regulate protein coding gene expression by binding to 3' UTRs, small nucleolar RNAs guide post-transcriptional modifications by binding to rRNA, U4 spliceosomal RNA and U6 spliceosomal RNA bind to each other forming part of the spliceosome and many small bacterial RNAs regulate gene expression by antisense interactions E.g. GcvB, OxyS and RyhB.

Name	Description	Intra-molecular structure	Comparative	Link	References
SQUARNA	SQUARNA predicts RNA secondary structure formed by several RNA sequences via stem maximization	Yes	Yes	sourcecode webserver	
RNApredator	RNApredator uses a dynamic programming approach to compute RNA-RNA interaction sites.	Yes	No	webserver	
GUUGle	A utility for fast determination of RNA-RNA matches with perfect hybridization via A-U, C-G, and G-U base pairing.	No	No	webserver	
IntaRNA	Efficient target prediction incorporating the accessibility of target sites.	Yes	No	sourcecode webserver	
CopraRNA	Tool for sRNA target prediction. It computes whole genome predictions by mix of distinct whole genome IntaRNA predictions.	Yes	Yes	sourcecode webserver	
MINT	Automatic tool to analyze three-dimensional structures of RNA and DNA molecules, their full-atom molecular dynamics trajectories or other conformation sets (e.g. X-ray or NMR-derived structures). For each RNA or DNA conformation MINT determines the hydrogen bonding network resolving the base pairing patterns, identifies secondary structure motifs (helices, junctions, loops, etc.) and pseudoknots. Also estimates the energy of stacking and phosphate anion-base interactions.	Yes	No	sourcecode webserver	
NUPACK	Computes the full unpseudoknotted partition function of interacting strands in dilute solution. Calculates the concentrations, mfes, and base-pairing probabilities of the ordered complexes below a certain complexity. Also computes the partition function and basepairing of single strands including a class of pseudoknotted structures. Also enables design of ordered complexes.	Yes	No	NUPACK	
OligoWalk/RNAstructure	Predicts bimolecular secondary structures with and without intramolecular structure. Also predicts the hybridization affinity of a short nucleic acid to an RNA target.	Yes	No		
piRNA	Calculates the partition function and thermodynamics of RNA-RNA interactions. It considers all possible joint secondary structure of two interacting nucleic acids that do not contain pseudoknots, interaction pseudoknots, or zigzags.	Yes	No	linuxbinary	
piRNAPred	an integrated framework for piRNA prediction employing hybrid features like k-mer nucleotide composition, secondary structure, thermodynamic and physicochemical properties.	Yes	No		
RNAripalign	Calculates the partition function and thermodynamics of RNA-RNA interactions based on structural alignments. Also supports RNA-RNA interaction prediction for single sequences. It outputs suboptimal structures based on Boltzmann distribution. It considers all possible joint secondary structure of two interacting nucleic acids that do not contain pseudoknots, interaction pseudoknots, or zigzags.	Yes	No		
RactIP	Fast and accurate prediction of RNA-RNA interaction using integer programming.	Yes	No	sourcecode webserver	
RNAaliduplex	Based on RNAduplex with bonuses for covarying sites	No	Yes	sourcecode	
RNAcofold	Works much like RNAfold, but allows specifying two RNA sequences which are then allowed to form a dimer structure.	Yes	No	sourcecode	
RNAduplex	Computes optimal and suboptimal secondary structures for hybridization. The calculation is simplified by allowing only inter-molecular base pairs.	No	No	sourcecode	
RNAhybrid	Tool to find the minimum free energy hybridisation of a long and a short RNA (≤ 30 nt).	No	No	sourcecode, webserver	
RNAup	Calculates the thermodynamics of RNA-RNA interactions. RNA-RNA binding is decomposed into two stages. (1) First the probability that a sequence interval (e.g. a binding site) remains unpaired is computed. (2) Then the binding energy given that the binding site is unpaired is calculated as the optimum over all possible types of bindings.	Yes	No	sourcecode	

== Intermolecular interactions: MicroRNA:any RNA ==
The below table includes interactions that are not limited to UTRs.

Name	Description	Cross-species	Intra-molecular structure	Comparative	Link	References
comTAR	A a web tool for the prediction of miRNA targets that is mainly based on the conservation of the potential regulation in plant species.	Yes	No	No	Web tool	
RNA22	The first link (precomputed predictions) provides RNA22 predictions for all protein coding transcripts in human, mouse, roundworm, and fruit fly. It allows visualizing the predictions within a cDNA map and also find transcripts where multiple miR's of interest target. The second web-site link (interactive/custom sequences) first finds putative microRNA binding sites in the sequence of interest, then identifies the targeted microRNA. Both tools are provided by the Computational Medicine Center at Thomas Jefferson University.	Yes	No	No	precomputed predictions interactive/custom sequences	
RNAhybrid	Tool to find the minimum free energy hybridisation of a long and a short RNA (≤ 30 nt).	Yes	No	No	sourcecode, webserver	
miRBooking	Simulates the stochiometric mode of action of microRNAs using a derivative of the Gale-Shapley algorithm for finding a stable set of duplexes. It uses quantifications for traversing the set of mRNA and microRNA pairs and seed complementarity for ranking and assigning sites.	Yes	No	No	sourcecode, webserver	

== Intermolecular interactions: MicroRNA:UTR ==
MicroRNAs regulate protein coding gene expression by binding to 3' UTRs, there are tools specifically designed for predicting these interactions. For an evaluation of target prediction methods on high-throughput experimental data see (Baek et al., Nature 2008), (Alexiou et al., Bioinformatics 2009), or (Ritchie et al., Nature Methods 2009)

Name	Description	Cross-species	Intra-molecular structure	Comparative	Link	References
Cupid	Method for simultaneous prediction of miRNA-target interactions and their mediated competing endogenous RNA (ceRNA) interactions. It is an integrative approach significantly improves on miRNA-target prediction accuracy as assessed by both mRNA and protein level measurements in breast cancer cell lines. Cupid is implemented in 3 steps: Step 1: re-evaluate candidate miRNA binding sites in 3' UTRs. Step2: interactions are predicted by integrating information about selected sites and the statistical dependency between the expression profiles of miRNA and putative targets. Step 3: Cupid assesses whether inferred targets compete for predicted miRNA regulators.	human	No	Yes	software (MATLAB)	
Diana-microT	Version 3.0 is an algorithm based on several parameters calculated individually for each microRNA and it combines conserved and non-conserved microRNA recognition elements into a final prediction score.	human, mouse	No	Yes	webserver	
MicroTar	An animal miRNA target prediction tool based on miRNA-target complementarity and thermodynamic data.	Yes	No	No	sourcecode	
miTarget	microRNA target gene prediction using a support vector machine.	Yes	No	No	webserver	
miRror	Based on the notion of a combinatorial regulation by an ensemble of miRNAs or genes. miRror integrates predictions from a dozen of miRNA resources that are based on complementary algorithms into a unified statistical framework	Yes	No	No	webserver	
PicTar	Combinatorial microRNA target predictions.	8 vertebrates	No	Yes	predictions	
PITA	Incorporates the role of target-site accessibility, as determined by base-pairing interactions within the mRNA, in microRNA target recognition.	Yes	Yes	No	executable, webserver, predictions	
RNA22	The first link (precomputed predictions) provides RNA22 predictions for all protein coding transcripts in human, mouse, roundworm, and fruit fly. It allows visualizing the predictions within a cDNA map and also find transcripts where multiple miR's of interest target. The second web-site link (interactive/custom sequences) first finds putative microRNA binding sites in the sequence of interest, then identifies the targeted microRNA. Both tools are provided by the Computational Medicine Center at Thomas Jefferson University.	Yes	No	No	precomputed predictions interactive/custom sequences	
RNAhybrid	Tool to find the minimum free energy hybridisation of a long and a short RNA (≤ 30 nt).	Yes	No	No	sourcecode, webserver	
Sylamer	Method to find significantly over or under-represented words in sequences according to a sorted gene list. Usually used to find significant enrichment or depletion of microRNA or siRNA seed sequences from microarray expression data.	Yes	No	No	sourcecode webserver	
TAREF	TARget REFiner (TAREF) predicts microRNA targets on the basis of multiple feature information derived from the flanking regions of the predicted target sites where traditional structure prediction approach may not be successful to assess the openness. It also provides an option to use encoded pattern to refine filtering.	Yes	No	No	server/sourcecode	
p-TAREF	plant TARget REFiner (p-TAREF) identifies plant microRNA targets on the basis of multiple feature information derived from the flanking regions of the predicted target sites where traditional structure prediction approach may not be successful to assess the openness. It also provides an option to use encoded pattern to refine filtering. It first time employed power of machine learning approach with scoring scheme through support vector regression (SVR) while considering structural and alignment aspects of targeting in plants with plant specific models. p-TAREF has been implemented in concurrent architecture in server and standalone form, making it one of the very few available target identification tools able to run concurrently on simple desktops while performing huge transcriptome level analysis accurately and fast. Also provides option to experimentally validate the predicted targets, on the spot, using expression data, which has been integrated in its back-end, to draw confidence on prediction along with SVR score.p-TAREF performance benchmarking has been done extensively through different tests and compared with other plant miRNA target identification tools. p-TAREF was found to perform better.	Yes	No	No	server/standalone	
TargetScan	Predicts biological targets of miRNAs by searching for the presence of sites that match the seed region of each miRNA. In flies and nematodes, predictions are ranked based on the probability of their evolutionary conservation. In zebrafish, predictions are ranked based on site number, site type, and site context, which includes factors that influence target-site accessibility. In mammals, the user can choose whether the predictions should be ranked based on the probability of their conservation or on site number, type, and context. In mammals and nematodes, the user can choose to extend predictions beyond conserved sites and consider all sites.	vertebrates, flies, nematodes	evaluated indirectly	Yes	sourcecode, webserver	

== ncRNA gene prediction software ==
Name	Description	Number of sequences (Note: Number of sequences: <any|num>.)	Alignment (Note: Alignment: predicts an alignment, <input|yes|no>.)	Structure (Note: Structure: predicts structure, <input|yes|no>.)	Link	References
Alifoldz	Assessing a multiple sequence alignment for the existence of an unusual stable and conserved RNA secondary structure.	any	input	Yes	sourcecode	
EvoFold	a comparative method for identifying functional RNA structures in multiple-sequence alignments. It is based on a probabilistic model-construction called a phylo-SCFG and exploits the characteristic differences of the substitution process in stem-pairing and unpaired regions to make its predictions.	any	input	Yes	linuxbinary	
GraphClust	Fast RNA structural clustering method to identify common (local) RNA secondary structures. Predicted structural clusters are presented as alignment. Due to the linear time complexity for clustering it is possible to analyse large RNA datasets.	any	Yes	Yes	sourcecode	
MSARi	heuristic search for statistically significant conservation of RNA secondary structure in deep multiple sequence alignments.	any	input	Yes	sourcecode	
QRNA	This is the code from Elena Rivas that accompanies a submitted manuscript "Noncoding RNA gene detection using comparative sequence analysis". QRNA uses comparative genome sequence analysis to detect conserved RNA secondary structures, including both ncRNA genes and cis-regulatory RNA structures.	2	input	Yes	sourcecode	
RNAz	program for predicting structurally conserved and thermodynamic stable RNA secondary structures in multiple sequence alignments. It can be used in genome wide screens to detect functional RNA structures, as found in noncoding RNAs and cis-acting regulatory elements of mRNAs.	any	input	Yes	sourcecode, webserver RNAz 2	
ScanFold	A program for predicting unique local RNA structures in large sequences with unusually stable folding.	1	None	Yes	sourcecode webserver	
Xrate	a program for analysis of multiple sequence alignments using phylogenetic grammars, that may be viewed as a flexible generalization of the "Evofold" program.	any	Yes	Yes	sourcecode	

== Family specific gene prediction software ==
Name	Description	Family	Link	References
ARAGORN	ARAGORN detects tRNA and tmRNA in nucleotide sequences.	tRNA tmRNA	webserver source	
miReader	miReader is a first of its type to detect mature miRNAs with no dependence on genomic or reference sequences. So far, discovering miRNAs was possible only with species for which genomic or reference sequences would be available as most of the miRNA discovery tools relied on drawing pre-miRNA candidates. Due to this, miRNA biology became limited to model organisms, mostly. miReader allows directly discerning mature miRNAs from small RNA sequencing data, with no need of genomic-reference sequences. It has been developed for many Phyla and species, from vertebrate to plant models. Its accuracy has been found to be consistently >90% in heavy validatory testing.	mature miRNA	webserver/source webserver/source	
miRNAminer	Given a search query, candidate homologs are identified using BLAST search and then tested for their known miRNA properties, such as secondary structure, energy, alignment and conservation, in order to assess their fidelity.	MicroRNA	webserver	
RISCbinder	Prediction of guide strand of microRNAs.	Mature miRNA	webserver	
RNAmicro	A SVM-based approach that, in conjunction with a non-stringent filter for consensus secondary structures, is capable of recognizing microRNA precursors in multiple sequence alignments.	MicroRNA	homepage	
RNAmmer	RNAmmer uses HMMER to annotate rRNA genes in genome sequences. Profiles were built using alignments from the European ribosomal RNA database and the 5S Ribosomal RNA Database.	rRNA	webserver source	
SnoReport	Uses a mix of RNA secondary structure prediction and machine learning that is designed to recognize the two major classes of snoRNAs, box C/D and box H/ACA snoRNAs, among ncRNA candidate sequences.	snoRNA	sourcecode	
SnoScan	Search for C/D box methylation guide snoRNA genes in a genomic sequence.	C/D box snoRNA	sourcecode, webserver	
tRNAscan-SE	a program for the detection of transfer RNA genes in genomic sequence.	tRNA	sourcecode, webserver	
miRNAFold	A fast ab initio software for searching for microRNA precursors in genomes.	microRNA	webserver	

== RNA homology search software ==
Name	Description	Link	References
DECIPHER (software)	FindNonCoding takes a pattern mining approach to capture the essential sequence motifs and hairpin loops representing a non-coding RNA family and quickly identify matches in genomes. FindNonCoding was designed for ease of use and accurately finds non-coding RNAs with a low false discovery rate.	sourcecode	
ERPIN	"Easy RNA Profile IdentificatioN" is an RNA motif search program reads a sequence alignment and secondary structure, and automatically infers a statistical "secondary structure profile" (SSP). An original Dynamic Programming algorithm then matches this SSP onto any target database, finding solutions and their associated scores.	sourcecode webserver	
Infernal	"INFERence of RNA ALignment" is for searching DNA sequence databases for RNA structure and sequence similarities. It is an implementation of a special case of profile stochastic context-free grammars called covariance models (CMs).	sourcecode	
GraphClust	Fast RNA structural clustering method to identify common (local) RNA secondary structures. Predicted structural clusters are presented as alignment. Due to the linear time complexity for clustering it is possible to analyse large RNA datasets.	sourcecode	
PHMMTS	"pair hidden Markov models on tree structures" is an extension of pair hidden Markov models defined on alignments of trees.	sourcecode, webserver	
RaveNnA	A slow and rigorous or fast and heuristic sequence-based filter for covariance models.	sourcecode	
RSEARCH	Takes one RNA sequence with its secondary structure and uses a local alignment algorithm to search a database for homologous RNAs.	sourcecode	
Structator	Ultra fast software for searching for RNA structural motifs employing an innovative index-based bidirectional matching algorithm combined with a new fast fragment chaining strategy.	sourcecode	
RaligNAtor	Fast online and index-based algorithms for approximate search of RNA sequence-structure patterns	sourcecode	

== Benchmarks ==
Name	Description	Structure (Note: Structure: benchmarks structure prediction tools <yes|no>.)	Alignment (Note: Alignment: benchmarks alignment tools <yes|no>.)	Phylogeny	Links	References
BRalibase I	A comprehensive comparison of comparative RNA structure prediction approaches	Yes	No	No	data	
BRalibase II	A benchmark of multiple sequence alignment programs upon structural RNAs	No	Yes	No	data	
BRalibase 2.1	A benchmark of multiple sequence alignment programs upon structural RNAs	No	Yes	No	data	
BRalibase III	A critical assessment of the performance of homology search methods on noncoding RNA	No	Yes	No	data	
CompaRNA	An independent comparison of single-sequence and comparative methods for RNA secondary structure prediction	Yes	No	No	AMU mirror or IIMCB mirror	
EternaBench	Database comprising the diverse high-throughput structural data gathered through the crowdsourced RNA design project Eterna	Yes	No	No	data	
RNAconTest	A test of RNA multiple sequence alignments based entirely on known three dimensional RNA structures	Yes	Yes	No	data	

== Alignment viewers, editors ==
Name	Description	Alignment (Note: Alignment: view and edit an alignment, <yes|no>.)	Structure (Note: Structure: view and edit structure, <yes|no>.)	Link	References
4sale	A tool for Synchronous RNA Sequence and Secondary Structure Alignment and Editing	Yes	Yes	sourcecode	
Colorstock, SScolor, Raton	Colorstock, a command-line script using ANSI terminal color; SScolor, a Perl script that generates static HTML pages; and Raton, an Ajax web application generating dynamic HTML. Each tool can be used to color RNA alignments by secondary structure and to visually highlight compensatory mutations in stems.	Yes	Yes	sourcecode	
Integrated Genome Browser (IGB)	Multiple alignment viewer written in Java.	Yes	No	sourcecode	
Jalview	Multiple alignment editor written in Java.	Yes	No	sourcecode	
RALEE	a major mode for the Emacs text editor. It provides functionality to aid the viewing and editing of multiple sequence alignments of structured RNAs.	Yes	Yes	sourcecode	
SARSE	A graphical sequence editor for working with structural alignments of RNA.	Yes	Yes	sourcecode	

== Inverse folding, RNA design ==
Name	Description	Link	References
	Single state design		
EteRNA/EteRNABot	An RNA folding game that challenges players to make sequences that fold into a target RNA structure. The best sequences for a given puzzle are synthesized and their structures are probed through chemical mapping. The sequences are then scored by the data's agreement to the target structure and feedback is provided to the players. EteRNABot is a software implementation based on design rules submitted by EteRNA players.	EteRNA Game EteRNABot web server	
RNAinverse	The ViennaRNA Package provides RNAinverse, an algorithm for designing sequences with desired structure.	Web Server	
RNAiFold	A complete RNA inverse folding approach based on constraint programming and implemented using OR Tools which allows for the specification of a wide range of design constraints. The RNAiFold software provides two algorithms to solve the inverse folding problem: i) RNA-CPdesign explores the complete search space and ii) RNA-LNSdesign based on the large neighborhood search metaheuristic is suitable to design large structures. The software can also design interacting RNA molecules using RNAcofold of the ViennaRNA Package. A fully functional, earlier implementation using COMET is available.	Web Server Source Code	
RNA-SSD/RNA Designer	The RNA-SSD (RNA Secondary Structure Designer) approach first assigns bases probabilistically to each position based probabilistic models. Subsequently, a stochastic local search is used to optimize this sequence. RNA-SSD is publicly available under the name of RNA Designer at the RNASoft web page	Web Server	
INFO-RNA	INFO-RNA uses a dynamic programming approach to generate an energy optimized starting sequence that is subsequently further improved by a stochastic local search that uses an effective neighbor selection method.	Web Server Source Code	
RNAexinv	RNAexinv is an extension of RNAinverse to generate sequences that not only fold into a desired structure, but they should also exhibit selected attributes such as thermodynamic stability and mutational robustness. This approach does not necessarily outputs a sequence that perfectly fits the input structure, but a shape abstraction, i.e. it keeps the adjacency and nesting of structural elements, but disregards helix lengths and the exact number unpaired positions, of it.	Source Code	
RNA-ensign	This approach applies an efficient global sampling algorithm to examine the mutational landscape under structural and thermodynamical constraints. The authors show that the global sampling approach is more robust, succeeds more often and generates more thermodynamically stable sequences than local approaches do.	Source Code	
IncaRNAtion	Successor of RNA-ensign that can specifically design sequences with a specified GC content using a GC-weighted Boltzmann ensemble and stochastic backtracking	Source Code	
DSS-Opt	Dynamics in Sequence Space Optimization (DSS-Opt) uses Newtonian dynamics in the sequence space, with a negative design term and simulated annealing to optimize a sequence such that it folds into the desired secondary structure.	Source Code	
MODENA	This approach interprets RNA inverse folding as a multi-objective optimization problem and solves it using a genetic algorithm. In its extended version MODENA is able to design pseudoknotted RNA structures with the aid of IPknot.	Source Code	
ERD	Evolutionary RNA Design (ERD) can be used to design RNA sequences that fold into a given target structure. Any RNA secondary structure contains different structural components, each having a different length. Therefore, in the first step, the RNA subsequences (pools) corresponding to different components with different lengths are reconstructed. Using these pools, ERD reconstructs an initial RNA sequence which is compatible with the given target structure. Then ERD uses an evolutionary algorithm to improve the quality of the subsequences corresponding to the components. The major contributions of ERD are using the natural RNA sequences, a different method to evaluate the sequences in each population, and a different hierarchical decomposition of the target structure into smaller substructures.	Web Server Source Code	
antaRNA	Uses an underlying ant colony foraging heuristic terrain modeling to solve the inverse folding problem. The designed RNA sequences show high compliance to input structural and sequence constraints. Most prominently, also the GC value of the designed sequence can be regulated with high precision. GC value distribution sampling of solution sets is possible and sequence domain specific definition of multiple GC values within one entity. Due to the flexible evaluation of the intermediate sequences using underlying programs such as RNAfold, pKiss, or also HotKnots and IPKnot, RNA secondary nested structures and also pseudoknot structures of H- and K-type are feasible to solve with this approach.	Web Server Source Code	
	Dual state design		
switch.pl	The ViennaRNA Package provides a Perl script to design RNA sequences that can adopt two states. For instance RNA thermometer, which change their structural state depending on the environmental temperature, have been successfully designed using this program.	Man Page Source Code	
RiboMaker	Intended to design small RNAs (sRNA) and their target mRNA's 5'UTR. The sRNA is designed to activate or repress protein expression of the mRNA. It is also possible to design just one of the two RNA components provided the other sequence is fixed.	Web Server Source Code	
	Multi state design		
RNAblueprint	This C++ library is based on the RNAdesign multiple target sampling algorithm. It brings a SWIG interface for Perl and Python which allows for an effortless integration into various tools. Therefore, multiple target sequence sampling can be combined with many optimization techniques and objective functions.	Source Code	
RNAdesign	The underlying algorithm is based on a mix of graph coloring and heuristic local optimization to find sequences can adapt multiple prescribed conformations. The software can also use of RNAcofold to design interacting RNA sequence pairs.	Source Code	
Frnakenstein	Frnakenstein applies a genetic algorithm to solve the inverse RNA folding problem.	Source Code	
ARDesigner	The Allosteric RNA Designer (ARDesigner) is a web-based tool that solves the inverse folding problem by incorporating mutational robustness. Beside a local search the software has been equipped with a simulated annealing approach to effectively search for good solutions. The tool has been used to design RNA thermometer.		

== Secondary structure viewers, editors ==
Name	Description	Link	References
PseudoViewer	Automatically visualizing RNA pseudoknot structures as planar graphs.	webapp/binary	
RNA Movies	browse sequential paths through RNA secondary structure landscapes	sourcecode	
RNA-DV	RNA-DV aims at providing an easy-to-use GUI for visualizing and designing RNA secondary structures. It allows users to interact directly with the RNA structure and perform operations such as changing primary sequence content and connect/disconnect nucleotide bonds. It also integrates thermodynamic energy calculations including four major energy models. RNA-DV recognizes three input formats including CT, RNAML and dot bracket (dp).	sourcecode	
RNA2D3D	Program to generate, view, and compare 3-dimensional models of RNA	binary	
RNAstructure	RNAstructure has a viewer for structures in ct files. It can also compare predicted structures using the circleplot program. Structures can be output as postscript files.	sourcecode	
RNAView/RnamlView	Use RNAView to automatically identify and classify the types of base pairs that are formed in nucleic acid structures. Use RnamlView to arrange RNA structures.	sourcecode	
RILogo	Visualizes the intra-/intermolecular base pairing of two interacting RNAs with sequence logos in a planar graph.	web server / sourcecode	
VARNA	A tool for the automated drawing, visualization and annotation of the secondary structure of RNA, initially designed as a companion software for web servers and databases	webapp/sourcecode	
forna	A web based viewer for displaying RNA secondary structures using the force-directed graph layout provided by the d3.js visualization library. It is based on fornac, a javascript container for simply drawing a secondary structure on a web page.	webappfornac sourceforna source	
R2R	Program for drawing aesthetic RNA consensus diagrams with automated pair covariance recognition. Rfam uses this program both for drawing the human-annotated SS and the R-scape covariance-optimized structure.	source	
RNAcanvas	A web app for drawing and exploring nucleic acid structures.	webapp	
RNAscape	Geometric mapping algorithm for RNA 3D structure to 2D diagram production, which attempts to preserve tertiary interaction topology, provided through an interactive webserver with various customizability options.	webserver sourcecode	

== See also ==
- RNA
- Non-coding RNA
- RNA structure
- Comparison of nucleic acid simulation software
- Comparison of software for molecular mechanics modeling
