= Secondary structure prediction =

Secondary structure prediction is a set of techniques in bioinformatics that aim to predict the secondary structures of proteins and nucleic acid sequences based only on knowledge of their primary structure. For proteins, this means predicting the formation of protein structures such as alpha helices and beta strands, while for nucleic acids it means predicting the formation of nucleic acid structures like helixes and stem-loop structures through base pairing and base stacking interactions.

Secondary structure prediction can refer to:

- Protein structure prediction
- Nucleic acid structure prediction

== See also ==
- List of protein secondary structure prediction programs
- List of RNA structure prediction software
