= Tymovirus/pomovirus tRNA-like 3 UTR element =

Tymovirus/Pomovirus tRNA-like 3' UTR element
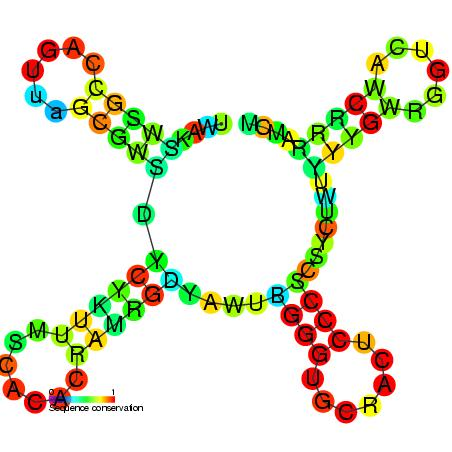
- Predicted secondary structure and sequence conservation of Tymo_tRNA-like

Identifiers
- Symbol: Tymo_tRNA-like
- Rfam: RF00233

Other data
- RNA type: Cis-reg
- Domain(s): Viruses
- SO: SO:0000205
- PDB structures: PDBe

The tymoviruses/pomovirusesfamily tRNA-like 3' UTR element is an RNA element found in the 3' UTR of some viruses. This element acts in conjunction with UPSK RNA and a 5'-cap to enhance translation. The secondary structure of this RNA element is a cloverleaf that resembles tRNA.
