= Chung Kwei (algorithm) =

Chung Kwei is a spam filtering algorithm based on the TEIRESIAS Algorithm for finding coding genes within bulk DNA. It is named after Zhong Kui, a figure in Chinese folklore.

== See also ==
- Spam (electronic)
- CAN-SPAM Act of 2003
- DNSBL
- SpamAssassin
