= TaveRNA =

taveRNA
- Developer: Simon Fraser University
- Website: link

taveRNA is a software suite for RNA/DNA secondary structure. It is developed in the laboratories for computational biology of the School of Computing Science at the Simon Fraser University. The suite is composed by alteRNA, for RNA density fold computing, inteRNA, for RNA-RNA interaction prediction, piRNA, for predicting the joint partition function, equilibrium concentration, ensemble energy, and melting temperature for two RNA sequences, pRuNA, a sequence based pruning RNA interaction search engine, and smyRNA, a platform independent C program novel ab initio ncRNA finder.

taveRNA is not related to the bioinformatics workflow system Apache Taverna.
