= Melting temperature =

Melting temperature may refer to:

- Melting point, the temperature at which a substance changes from solid to liquid state
- Melting temperature, the temperature at which a DNA double helix dissociates into single strands (see Nucleic acid thermodynamics)
