= RNA22 =

Rna22 is a pattern-based algorithm for the discovery of microRNA target sites and the corresponding heteroduplexes.

The algorithm is conceptually distinct from other methods for predicting microRNA:mRNA heteroduplexes in that it does not use experimentally validated heteroduplexes for training, instead relying only on the sequences of known mature miRNAs that are found in the public databases. The key idea of rna22 is that the reverse complement of any salient sequence features that one can identify in mature microRNA sequences (using pattern discovery techniques) should allow one to identify candidate microRNA target sites in a sequence of interest: rna22 makes use of the Teiresias algorithm to discover such salient features. Once a candidate microRNA target site has been located, the targeting microRNA can be identified with the help of any of several algorithms able to compute RNA:RNA heteroduplexes. A new version (v2.0) of the algorithm is now available: v2.0-beta adds probability estimates to each prediction, gives users the ability to choose the sensitivity/specificity settings on-the-fly, is significantly faster than the original, and can be accessed through http://cm.jefferson.edu/rna22/Interactive/.

Rna22 neither relies on nor imposes any cross-organism conservation constraints to filter out unlikely candidates; this gives it the ability to discover microRNA binding sites that may not be conserved in phylogenetically proximal organisms. Also, as mentioned above, rna22 can identify putative microRNA binding sites without needing to know the identity of the targeting microRNA. A notable property of rna22 is that it does not require the presence of the exact reverse complement of a microRNA's seed in a putative target permitting bulges and G:U wobbles in the seed region of the heteroduplex. Lastly, the algorithm has been shown to achieve high signal-to-noise ratio.

Use of rna22 led to the discovery of "non-canonical" microRNA targets in the coding regions of the mouse Nanog, Oct4 and Sox2. Most of these targets are not conserved in the human orthologues of these three transcription factors even though they reside in the coding region of the corresponding mRNAs. Moreover, most of these targets contain G:U wobbles, one or more bulges, or both, in the seed region of the heteroduplex. In addition to coding regions, rna22 has helped discover non-canonical targets in 3'UTRs.

A recent study examined the problem of non-canonical miRNA targets using molecular dynamics simulations of the crystal structure of the Argonaute-miRNA:mRNA ternary complex. The study found that several kinds of modifications, including combinations of multiple G:U wobbles and mismatches in the seed region, are admissible and result in only minor structural fluctuations that do not affect the stability of the ternary complex. The study also showed that the findings of the molecular dynamics simulation are supported by HITS-CLIP (CLIP-seq) data. These results suggest that bona fide miRNA targets transcend the canonical seed-model in turn making target prediction tools like rna22 an ideal choice for exploring the newly augmented spectrum of miRNA targets.

Name	Description	type	Link	References
RNA22 version 2.0	The first web-site link (interactive & dynamic) permits the user to find on-the-fly putative miRNA binding sites for any sequence of interest (i.e. a protein-coding mRNA, or long non-coding RNA) and for any miRNA (publicly known or novel). The second link (precomputed & static) provides access to RNA22 v2 predictions for all protein coding transcripts in human, mouse, roundworm, and fruit fly. It allows the user to visualize the predictions within a cDNA map and also find transcripts where multiple miRNA's of interest target.	microRNA target predictions	interactive predictions precomputed predictions	TBD
RNA22	The link (precomputed & static) provides access to RNA22 predictions for all protein coding transcripts in human, mouse, roundworm, and fruit fly. It allows you to visualize the predictions within a cDNA map and also find transcripts where multiple miRNA's of interest target.	microRNA target predictions	precomputed predictions	
