= Tiresias (disambiguation) =

Tiresias was a blind prophet in Greek mythology.

Tiresias may also refer to:

- Tiresias (ballet), by Constant Lambert
- Tiresias (horse)
- Tiresias (typeface)
- Teiresias algorithm
- Tirésias Simon Sam (1835–1916), President of Haiti
- Tom Driberg (1905–1976), pseudonymously Tiresias, British journalist, politician, and crossword compiler
