= UPSK RNA =

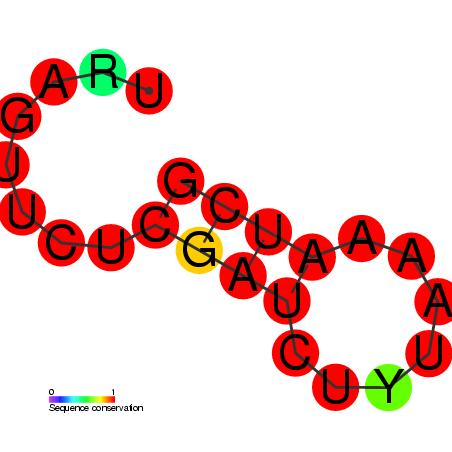
- Predicted secondary structure and sequence conservation of UPSK

Identifiers
- Symbol: UPSK
- Rfam: RF00390

Other data
- RNA type: Cis-reg
- Domain(s): Viruses
- SO: SO:0000233
- PDB structures: PDBe

The Upstream pseudoknot (UPSK) domain is an RNA element found in the turnip yellow mosaic virus, beet virus Q, barley stripe mosaic virus and tobacco mosaic virus, which is thought to be needed for efficient transcription. Disruption of the pseudoknot structure gives rise to a 50% drop in transcription efficiency. This element acts in conjunction with the Tymovirus/Pomovirus tRNA-like 3' UTR element to enhance translation.
