= Sfold =

RNA secondary structure prediction and application software

- Original author(s): Ye Ding and Charles E. Lawrence
- Developer(s): Dang Long and Chaochun Liu (application modeling); Clarence Chan, Adam Wolenc, William A. Rennie and Charles S. Carmack (software development)
- Initial release: 1 April 2003; 22 years ago
- Repository: github.com/Ding-RNA-Lab/Sfold
- Operating system: Linux
- Website: www.healthresearch.org/sfold-software-for-sirna/

Sfold is a software program developed to predict probable RNA secondary structures through structure-ensemble sampling and centroid predictions with a focus on assessment of RNA target accessibility, for major applications to the rational design of siRNAs in the suppression of gene expressions, and to the identification of targets for regulatory RNAs, particularly microRNAs.

== Development ==
The core RNA-secondary-structure-prediction algorithm is based on rigorous statistical (stochastic) sampling of Boltzmann ensemble of RNA secondary structures, enabling statistical characterization of any local structural features of potential interest to experimental investigators. In a review on nucleic-acid structure and prediction, the potential of structure sampling described in a prototype algorithm was highlighted. With the publication of the mature algorithms for Sfold, the sampling approach became the focus of a comprehensive review, with both the sampling approach and the centroid predictions being discussed.

As an application module of the Sfold package, the STarMir program has been widely used for its capability in modeling target accessibility. STarMir was described in an independent study on microRNA target prediction, and STarMir predictions have been used in an attempt to derive improved predictions. Predictions by Sfold have led to new biological insights. The novel ideas of ensemble sampling and centroids have been adopted by others not only for RNA problems, but also for other fundamental problems in computational biology and genomics.

An implementation of stochastic sampling has been included in two widely used RNA software packages: RNA Structure and the ViennaRNA Package, which are also based on the Turner RNA thermodynamic parameters. Sfold was featured on a Nucleic Acids Research cover, and was highlighted in Science NetWatch. The underlying novel model for STarMir was featured in the Cell Biology section of Nature Research Highlights.

== Distribution ==
Sfold runs under Linux, is freely available to the scientific community for non-commercial applications, and is available under license for commercial applications. Both the source code and the executables are available at GitHub.
