= Partition function for Interacting RNAs =

Software package used to predict RNA interactions

Partition function for Interacting RNAs (piRNA) is a parallel C++ package to compute joint and individual partition functions for two RNA sequences. From the partition functions, piRNA computes equilibrium concentrations of single and double species, ensemble energy, melting temperatures, and base pair probabilities. piRNA is part of TaveRNA RNA software suite.

piRNA algorithm has been published in Bioinformatics 25(12):i365-i373; doi:10.1093/bioinformatics/btp212 PMID 19478011.
