= Yass (software) =

Bioinformatics software

YASS
- Stable release: 1.14
- Written in: C
- Operating system: Linux, Mac, MS-Windows
- Type: Bioinformatics tool
- Licence: GPLv2 CeCILL
- Website: https://bioinfo.univ-lille.fr/yass/
- Repository: github.com/laurentnoe/yass

YASS (Yet Another Similarity Searcher) is a free software, pairwise sequence alignment software for nucleotide sequences, that is, it can search for similarities between DNA or RNA sequences. YASS accepts nucleotide sequences in either plain text or the FASTA format and the output format includes the BLAST tabular output. YASS uses several transition-constrained spaced seed k-mers, which allow considerably improved sensitivity. YASS can be used locally on a user's machine, or as SaaS on the YASS web server, which produces a browser based dot-plot.

== See also ==
- Sequence alignment software
- PatternHunter
- BLAST
- FASTA
- JAligner
