= List of sequence alignment software =

This list of sequence alignment software is a compilation of software tools and web portals used in pairwise sequence alignment and multiple sequence alignment. See structural alignment software for structural alignment of proteins.

== Database search only ==
Name	Description	Sequence type*	Authors	Year
BLAST	Local search with fast k-tuple heuristic (Basic Local Alignment Search Tool)	Both	Altschul SF, Gish W, Miller W, Myers EW, Lipman DJ	1990
HPC-BLAST	NCBI compliant multinode and multicore BLAST wrapper. Distributed with the latest version of BLAST, this wrapper facilitates parallelization of the algorithm on modern hybrid architectures with many nodes and many cores within each node.	Protein	Burdyshaw CE, Sawyer S, Horton MD, Brook RG, Rekapalli B	2017
CS-BLAST	Sequence-context specific BLAST, more sensitive than BLAST, FASTA, and SSEARCH. Position-specific iterative version CSI-BLAST more sensitive than PSI-BLAST	Protein	Angermueller C, Biegert A, Soeding J	2013
CUDASW++	GPU accelerated Smith Waterman algorithm for multiple shared-host GPUs	Protein	Liu Y, Maskell DL and Schmidt B	2009/2010
DIAMOND	BLASTP and BLASTX aligner based on double indexing	Protein	Buchfink BJ, Xie C, Huson DH, Reuter K, Drost HG	2015/2021
FASTA	Local search with fast k-tuple heuristic, slower but more sensitive than BLAST	Both		
GGSEARCH, GLSEARCH	Global:Global (GG), Global:Local (GL) alignment with statistics	Protein		
Genome Magician	Software for ultra fast local DNA sequence motif search and pairwise alignment for NGS data (FASTA, FASTQ).	DNA	Hepperle D (www.sequentix.de)	2020
Genoogle	Genoogle uses indexing and parallel processing techniques for searching DNA and Proteins sequences. It is developed in Java and open source.	Both	Albrecht F	2015
HMMER	Local and global search with profile Hidden Markov models, more sensitive than PSI-BLAST	Both	Durbin R, Eddy SR, Krogh A, Mitchison G	1998
HH-suite	Pairwise comparison of profile Hidden Markov models; very sensitive	Protein	Söding J	2005/2012
IDF	Inverse Document Frequency	Both		
Infernal	Profile SCFG search	RNA	Eddy S	
KLAST	High-performance general purpose sequence similarity search tool	Both		2009/2014
LAMBDA	High performance local aligner compatible to BLAST, but much faster; supports SAM/BAM	Protein	Hannes Hauswedell, Jochen Singer, Knut Reinert	2014
MMseqs2	Software suite to search and cluster huge sequence sets. Similar sensitivity to BLAST and PSI-BLAST but orders of magnitude faster	Protein	Steinegger M, Mirdita M, Galiez C, Söding J	2017
USEARCH	Ultra-fast sequence analysis tool	Both	Edgar, R. C. (2010). "Search and clustering orders of magnitude faster than BLAST". Bioinformatics. 26 (19): 2460–2461. doi:10.1093/bioinformatics/btq461. PMID 20709691. publication	2010
OSWALD	OpenCL Smith-Waterman on Altera's FPGA for Large Protein Databases	Protein	Rucci E, García C, Botella G, De Giusti A, Naiouf M, Prieto-Matías M	2016
parasail	Fast Smith-Waterman search using SIMD parallelization	Both	Daily J	2015
PSI-BLAST	Position-specific iterative BLAST, local search with position-specific scoring matrices, much more sensitive than BLAST	Protein	Altschul SF, Madden TL, Schäffer AA, Zhang J, Zhang Z, Miller W, Lipman DJ	1997
PSI-Search	Combining the Smith-Waterman search algorithm with the PSI-BLAST profile construction strategy to find distantly related protein sequences, and preventing homologous over-extension errors.	Protein	Li W, McWilliam H, Goujon M, Cowley A, Lopez R, Pearson WR	2012
R&R	Retrieve and Relate (R&R) is a high performance yet sensitive multi-database search engine, capable of searching in parallel through DNA, RNA and Protein sequences.	Both		2019
ScalaBLAST	Highly parallel Scalable BLAST	Both	Oehmen et al.	2011
Sequilab	Linking and profiling sequence alignment data from NCBI-BLAST results with major sequence analysis servers/services	Nucleotide, peptide		2010
SAM	Local and global search with profile Hidden Markov models, more sensitive than PSI-BLAST	Both	Karplus K, Krogh A	1999
SSEARCH	Smith-Waterman search, slower but more sensitive than FASTA	Both		
SWAPHI	First parallelized algorithm employing the emerging Intel Xeon Phis to accelerate Smith-Waterman protein database search	Protein	Liu Y and Schmidt B	2014
SWAPHI-LS	First parallel Smith-Waterman algorithm exploiting Intel Xeon Phi clusters to accelerate the alignment of long DNA sequences	DNA	Liu Y, Tran TT, Lauenroth F, Schmidt B	2014
SWIMM	Smith-Waterman implementation for Intel Multicore and Manycore architectures	Protein	Rucci E, García C, Botella G, De Giusti A, Naiouf M and Prieto-Matías M	2015
SWIMM2.0	Enhanced Smith-Waterman on Intel's Multicore and Manycore architectures based on AVX-512 vector extensions	Protein	Rucci E, García C, Botella G, De Giusti A, Naiouf M and Prieto-Matías M	2018
SWIPE	Fast Smith-Waterman search using SIMD parallelization	Both	Rognes T	2011

*Sequence type: protein or nucleotide

== Pairwise alignment ==
Name	Description	Sequence type*	Alignment type**	Author	Year
ACANA	Fast heuristic anchor based pairwise alignment	Both	Both	Huang, Umbach, Li	2005
AlignMe	Alignments for membrane protein sequences	Protein	Both	M. Stamm, K. Khafizov, R. Staritzbichler, L.R. Forrest	2013
ALLALIGN	For DNA, RNA and protein molecules up to 32MB, aligns all sequences of size K or greater. Similar alignments are grouped together for analysis. Automatic repetitive sequence filter.	Both	Local	E. Wachtel	2017
Bioconductor Biostrings::pairwiseAlignment	Dynamic programming	Both	Both + Ends-free	P. Aboyoun	2008
BioPerl dpAlign	Dynamic programming	Both	Both + Ends-free	Y. M. Chan	2003
BLASTZ, LASTZ	Seeded pattern-matching	Nucleotide	Local	Schwartz et al.	2004, 2009
CodonCode Aligner	Fast pairwise and multi-sequence alignments with multiple algorithms.	Nucleotide	Both	CodonCode Corporation	2003-2025
CUDAlign	DNA sequence alignment of unrestricted size in single or multiple GPUs	Nucleotide	Local, SemiGlobal, Global	E. Sandes	2011-2015
DNADot	Web-based dot-plot tool	Nucleotide	Global	R. Bowen	1998
DOTLET	Java-based dot-plot tool	Both	Global	M. Pagni and T. Junier	1998
FEAST	Posterior based local extension with descriptive evolution model	Nucleotide	Local	A. K. Hudek and D. G. Brown	2010
Genome Compiler Genome Compiler	Align chromatogram files (.ab1, .scf) against a template sequence, locate errors, and correct them instantly.	Nucleotide	Local	Genome Compiler Corporation	2014
G-PAS	GPU-based dynamic programming with backtracking	Both	Local, SemiGlobal, Global	W. Frohmberg, M. Kierzynka et al.	2011
GapMis	Does pairwise sequence alignment with one gap	Both	SemiGlobal	K. Frousios, T. Flouri, C. S. Iliopoulos, K. Park, S. P. Pissis, G. Tischler	2012
Genome Magician	Software for ultra fast local DNA sequence motif search and pairwise alignment for NGS data (FASTA, FASTQ).	DNA	Local, SemiGlobal, Global	Hepperle D (www.sequentix.de)	2020
GGSEARCH, GLSEARCH	Global:Global (GG), Global:Local (GL) alignment with statistics	Protein	Global in query	W. Pearson	2007
JAligner	Java open-source implementation of Smith-Waterman	Both	Local	A. Moustafa	2005
K*Sync	Protein sequence to structure alignment that includes secondary structure, structural conservation, structure-derived sequence profiles, and consensus alignment scores	Protein	Both	D. Chivian & D. Baker	2003
LALIGN	Multiple, non-overlapping, local similarity (same algorithm as SIM)	Both	Local non-overlapping	W. Pearson	1991 (algorithm)
NW-align	Standard Needleman-Wunsch dynamic programming algorithm	Protein	Global	Y Zhang	2012
matcher	Waterman-Eggert local alignment (based on LALIGN)	Both	Local	I. Longden (modified from W. Pearson)	1999
MCALIGN2	explicit models of indel evolution	DNA	Global	J. Wang et al.	2006
MegAlign Pro (Lasergene Molecular Biology)	Software to align DNA, RNA, protein, or DNA + protein sequences via pairwise and multiple sequence alignment algorithms including MUSCLE, Mauve, MAFFT, Clustal Omega, Jotun Hein, Wilbur-Lipman, Martinez Needleman-Wunsch, Lipman-Pearson and Dotplot analysis.	Both	Both	DNASTAR	1993-2016
MUMmer	suffix tree based	Nucleotide	Global	S. Kurtz et al.	2004
needle	Needleman-Wunsch dynamic programming	Both	SemiGlobal	A. Bleasby	1999
Ngila	logarithmic and affine gap costs and explicit models of indel evolution	Both	Global	R. Cartwright	2007
NW	Needleman-Wunsch dynamic programming	Both	Global	A.C.R. Martin	1990-2015
parasail	C/C++/Python/Java SIMD dynamic programming library for SSE, AVX2	Both	Global, Ends-free, Local	J. Daily	2015
Path	Smith-Waterman on protein back-translation graph (detects frameshifts at protein level)	Protein	Local	M. Gîrdea et al.	2009
PatternHunter	Seeded pattern-matching	Nucleotide	Local	B. Ma et al.	2002–2004
ProbA (also propA)	Stochastic partition function sampling via dynamic programming	Both	Global	U. Mückstein	2002
PyMOL	"align" command aligns sequence & applies it to structure	Protein	Global (by selection)	W. L. DeLano	2007
REPuter	suffix tree based	Nucleotide	Local	S. Kurtz et al.	2001
SABERTOOTH	Alignment using predicted Connectivity Profiles	Protein	Global	F. Teichert, J. Minning, U. Bastolla, and M. Porto	2009
Satsuma	Parallel whole-genome synteny alignments	DNA	Local	M.G. Grabherr et al.	2010
SEQALN	Various dynamic programming	Both	Local or global	M.S. Waterman and P. Hardy	1996
SIM, GAP, NAP, LAP	Local similarity with varying gap treatments	Both	Local or global	X. Huang and W. Miller	1990-6
SIM	Local similarity	Both	Local	X. Huang and W. Miller	1991
SPA: Super pairwise alignment	Fast pairwise global alignment	Nucleotide	Global	Shen, Yang, Yao, Hwang	2002
SSEARCH	Local (Smith-Waterman) alignment with statistics	Protein	Local	W. Pearson	1981 (Algorithm)
Sequences Studio	Java applet demonstrating various algorithms from	Generic sequence	Local and global	A.Meskauskas	1997 (reference book)
SWIFOLD	Smith-Waterman Acceleration on Intel's FPGA with OpenCL for Long DNA Sequences	Nucleotide	Local	E. Rucci	2017-2018
SWIFT suit	Fast Local Alignment Searching	DNA	Local	K. Rasmussen, W. Gerlach	2005, 2008
stretcher	Memory-optimized Needleman-Wunsch dynamic programming	Both	Global	I. Longden (modified from G. Myers and W. Miller)	1999
tranalign	Aligns nucleic acid sequences given a protein alignment	Nucleotide	NA	G. Williams (modified from B. Pearson)	2002
UGENE	Opensource Smith-Waterman for SSE/CUDA, Suffix array based repeats finder & dotplot	Both	Both	UniPro	2010
water	Smith-Waterman dynamic programming	Both	Local	A. Bleasby	1999
wordmatch	k-tuple pairwise match	Both	NA	I. Longden	1998
YASS	Seeded pattern-matching	Nucleotide	Local	L. Noe and G. Kucherov	2004

*Sequence type: protein or nucleotide **Alignment type: local or global

== Multiple sequence alignment ==
Name	Description	Sequence type*	Alignment type**	Author	Year	License
ABA	A-Bruijn alignment	Protein	Global	B.Raphael et al.	2004	Proprietary, freeware for education, research, nonprofit
ALE	manual alignment; some software assistance	Nucleotides	Local	J. Blandy and K. Fogel	1994 (latest version 2007)	Free, GPL2
ALLALIGN	For DNA, RNA and protein molecules up to 32MB, aligns all sequences of size K or greater, MSA or within a single molecule. Similar alignments are grouped together for analysis. Automatic repetitive sequence filter.	Both	Local	E. Wachtel	2017	Free
AMAP	Sequence annealing	Both	Global	A. Schwartz and L. Pachter	2006	
BAli-Phy	Tree+multi-alignment; probabilistic-Bayesian; joint estimation	Both + Codons	Global	BD Redelings and MA Suchard	2005 (latest version 2018)	Free, GPL
Base-By-Base	Java-based multiple sequence alignment editor with integrated analysis tools	Both	Local or global	R. Brodie et al.	2004	Proprietary, freeware, must register
CHAOS, DIALIGN	Iterative alignment	Both	Local (preferred)	M. Brudno and B. Morgenstern	2003	
Clustal	Progressive alignment	Both	Local or global	Thompson et al.	1994	Free, LGPL
CodonCode Aligner	Multi-alignment; Muscle, Clustal & Phrap support	Nucleotides	Local or global	P. Richterich et al.	2003 (latest version 2024)	
Compass	COmparison of Multiple Protein sequence Alignments with assessment of Statistical Significance	Protein	Global	R.I. Sadreyev, et al.	2009	
DECIPHER	Progressive-iterative alignment	Both	Global	Erik S. Wright	2014	Free, GPL
DIALIGN-TX and DIALIGN-T	Segment-based method	Both	Local (preferred) or Global	A.R.Subramanian	2005 (latest version 2008)	
DNA Alignment	Segment-based method for intraspecific alignments	Both	Local (preferred) or Global	A.Roehl	2005 (latest version 2008)	
DNA Baser Sequence Assembler	Multi-alignment; Full automatic sequence alignment; Automatic ambiguity correction; Internal base caller; Command line seq alignment	Nucleotides	Local or global	Heracle BioSoft SRL	2006 (latest version 2018)	Commercial (some modules are freeware)
DNADynamo	linked DNA to Protein multiple alignment with MUSCLE, Clustal and Smith-Waterman	Both	Local or global	DNADynamo	2004 (newest version 2017)	
EDNA	Energy Based Multiple Sequence Alignment for DNA Binding Sites	Nucleotides	Local or global	Salama, RA. et al.	2013	
FAMSA	Progressive alignment for extremely large protein families (hundreds of thousands of members)	Protein	Global	Deorowicz et al.	2016	Free, GPL 3
FSA	Sequence annealing	Both	Global	R. K. Bradley et al.	2008	
Geneious	Progressive-Iterative alignment; ClustalW plugin	Both	Local or global	A.J. Drummond et al.	2005 (latest version 2017)	
GUIDANCE	Quality control and filtering of multiple sequence alignments	Both	Local or global	O. Penn et al.	2010 (latest version 2015)	
Kalign	Progressive alignment	Both	Global	T. Lassmann	2005	
MACSE	Progressive-iterative alignment. Multiple alignment of coding sequences accounting for frameshifts and stop codons.	Nucleotides	Global	V. Ranwez et al.	2011 (latest version, v2.07 2023)	
MAFFT	Progressive-iterative alignment	Both	Local or global	K. Katoh et al.	2005	Free, BSD
MARNA	Multi-alignment of RNAs	RNA	Local	S. Siebert et al.	2005	
MAVID	Progressive alignment	Both	Global	N. Bray and L. Pachter	2004	
MegAlign Pro (Lasergene Molecular Biology)	Software to align DNA, RNA, protein, or DNA + protein sequences via pairwise and multiple sequence alignment algorithms including MUSCLE, Mauve, MAFFT, Clustal Omega, Jotun Hein, Wilbur-Lipman, Martinez Needleman-Wunsch, Lipman-Pearson and Dotplot analysis.	Both	Local or global	DNASTAR	1993-2023	
MSA	Dynamic programming	Both	Local or global	D.J. Lipman et al.	1989 (modified 1995)	
MSAProbs	Dynamic programming	Protein	Global	Y. Liu, B. Schmidt, D. Maskell	2010	
MULTALIN	Dynamic programming-clustering	Both	Local or global	F. Corpet	1988	
Multi-LAGAN	Progressive dynamic programming alignment	Both	Global	M. Brudno et al.	2003	
MUSCLE	Progressive-iterative alignment (v3), Probabilistic/consistency (v5)	Both	Local or global	R. Edgar	2004	Public domain
Opal	Progressive-iterative alignment	Both	Local or global	T. Wheeler and J. Kececioglu	2007 (latest stable 2013, latest beta 2016)	
Pecan	Probabilistic-consistency	DNA	Global	B. Paten et al.	2008	
Phylo	A human computing framework for comparative genomics to solve multiple alignment	Nucleotides	Local or global	McGill Bioinformatics	2010	
PMFastR	Progressive structure aware alignment	RNA	Global	D. DeBlasio, J Braund, S Zhang	2009	
Praline	Progressive-iterative-consistency-homology-extended alignment with preprofiling and secondary structure prediction	Protein	Global	J. Heringa	1999 (latest version 2009)	
PicXAA	Nonprogressive, maximum expected accuracy alignment	Both	Global	S.M.E. Sahraeian and B.J. Yoon	2010	
POA	Partial order/hidden Markov model	Protein	Local or global	C. Lee	2002	
Probalign	Probabilistic/consistency with partition function probabilities	Protein	Global	Roshan and Livesay	2006	Free, public domain
ProbCons	Probabilistic/consistency	Protein	Local or global	C. Do et al.	2005	Free, public domain
PROMALS3D	Progressive alignment/hidden Markov model/Secondary structure/3D structure	Protein	Global	J. Pei et al.	2008	
PRRN/PRRP	Iterative alignment (especially refinement)	Protein	Local or global	Y. Totoki (based on O. Gotoh)	1991 and later	
PSAlign	Alignment preserving non-heuristic	Both	Local or global	S.H. Sze, Y. Lu, Q. Yang.	2006	
RevTrans	Combines DNA and Protein alignment, by back translating the protein alignment to DNA.	DNA/Protein (special)	Local or global	Wernersson and Pedersen	2003 (newest version 2005)	
SAGA	Sequence alignment by genetic algorithm	Protein	Local or global	C. Notredame et al.	1996 (new version 1998)	
SAM	Hidden Markov model	Protein	Local or global	A. Krogh et al.	1994 (most recent version 2002)	
Se-Al	Manual alignment	Both	Local	A. Rambaut	2002	
StatAlign	Bayesian co-estimation of alignment and phylogeny (MCMC)	Both	Global	A. Novak et al.	2008	
Stemloc	Multiple alignment and secondary structure prediction	RNA	Local or global	I. Holmes	2005	Free, GPL 3 (parte de DART)
T-Coffee	More sensitive progressive alignment	Both	Local or global	C. Notredame et al.	2000 (newest version 2008)	Free, GPL 2
UGENE	Supports multiple alignment with MUSCLE, KAlign, Clustal and MAFFT plugins	Both	Local or global	UGENE team	2010 (newest version 2020)	Free, GPL 2
VectorFriends	VectorFriends Aligner, MUSCLE plugin, and ClustalW plugin	Both	Local or global	BioFriends team	2013	Proprietary, freeware for academic use
GLProbs	Adaptive pair-Hidden Markov Model based approach	Protein	Global	Y. Ye et al.	2013	

*Sequence type: protein or nucleotide. **Alignment type: local or global

== Genomics analysis ==
Name	Description	Sequence type*
EAGLE	An ultra-fast tool to find relative absent words in genomic data	Nucleotide
ACT (Artemis Comparison Tool)	Synteny and comparative genomics	Nucleotide
AVID	Pairwise global alignment with whole genomes	Nucleotide
BLAT	Alignment of cDNA sequences to a genome.	Nucleotide
DECIPHER	Alignment of rearranged genomes using 6 frame translation	Nucleotide
FLAK	Fuzzy whole genome alignment and analysis	Nucleotide
GMAP	Alignment of cDNA sequences to a genome. Identifies splice site junctions with high accuracy.	Nucleotide
Splign	Alignment of cDNA sequences to a genome. Identifies splice site junctions with high accuracy. Able to recognize and separate gene duplications.	Nucleotide
Mauve	Multiple alignment of rearranged genomes	Nucleotide
MGA	Multiple Genome Aligner	Nucleotide
Mulan	Local multiple alignments of genome-length sequences	Nucleotide
Multiz	Multiple alignment of genomes	Nucleotide
PLAST-ncRNA	Search for ncRNAs in genomes by partition function local alignment	Nucleotide
Sequerome	Profiling sequence alignment data with major servers/services	Nucleotide, peptide
Sequilab	Profiling sequence alignment data from NCBI-BLAST results with major servers-services	Nucleotide, peptide
Shuffle-LAGAN	Pairwise global alignment of completed genome regions	Nucleotide
SIBsim4, Sim4	A program designed to align an expressed DNA sequence with a genomic sequence, allowing for introns	Nucleotide
SLAM	Gene finding, alignment, annotation (human-mouse homology identification)	Nucleotide
SRPRISM	An efficient aligner for assemblies with explicit guarantees, aligning reads without splices	Nucleotide

*Sequence type: protein or nucleotide

== Motif finding ==
Name	Description	Sequence type*
PMS	Motif search and discovery	Both
FMM	Motif search and discovery (can get also positive & negative sequences as input for enriched motif search)	Nucleotide
BLOCKS	Ungapped motif identification from BLOCKS database	Both
eMOTIF	Extraction and identification of shorter motifs	Both
Gibbs motif sampler	Stochastic motif extraction by statistical likelihood	Both
HMMTOP	Prediction of transmembrane helices and topology of proteins	Protein
I-sites	Local structure motif library	Protein
JCoils	Prediction of Coiled coil and Leucine Zipper	Protein
MEME/MAST	Motif discovery and search	Both
CUDA-MEME	GPU accelerated MEME (v4.4.0) algorithm for GPU clusters	Both
MERCI	Discriminative motif discovery and search	Both
PHI-Blast	Motif search and alignment tool	Both
Phyloscan	Motif search tool	Nucleotide
PRATT	Pattern generation for use with ScanProsite	Protein
ScanProsite	Motif database search tool	Protein
TEIRESIAS	Motif extraction and database search	Both
BASALT	Multiple motif and regular expression search	Both

*Sequence type: protein or nucleotide

== Benchmarking ==
Name	Authors
PFAM 30.0 (2016)	
SMART (2015)	Letunic, Copley, Schmidt, Ciccarelli, Doerks, Schultz, Ponting, Bork
BAliBASE 3 (2015)	Thompson, Plewniak, Poch
Oxbench (2011)	Raghava, Searle, Audley, Barber, Barton
Benchmark collection (2009)	Edgar
HOMSTRAD (2005)	Mizuguchi
PREFAB 4.0 (2005)	Edgar
SABmark (2004)	Van Walle, Lasters, Wyns

== Alignment viewers, editors ==
Please see List of alignment visualization software.

== Short-read sequence alignment ==
Name	Description	paired-end option	Use FASTQ quality	Gapped	Multi-threaded	License	Reference	Year	
Arioc	Computes Smith-Waterman gapped alignments and mapping qualities on one or more GPUs. Supports BS-seq alignments. Processes 100,000 to 500,000 reads per second (varies with data, hardware, and configured sensitivity).	Yes	No	Yes	Yes	Free, BSD		2015	
BarraCUDA	A GPGPU accelerated Burrows–Wheeler transform (FM-index) short read alignment program based on BWA, supports alignment of indels with gap openings and extensions.	Yes	No	Yes	Yes, POSIX Threads and CUDA	Free, GPL			
BBMap	Uses a short kmers to rapidly index genome; no size or scaffold count limit. Higher sensitivity and specificity than Burrows–Wheeler aligners, with similar or greater speed. Performs affine-transform-optimized global alignment, which is slower but more accurate than Smith-Waterman. Handles Illumina, 454, PacBio, Sanger, and Ion Torrent data. Splice-aware; capable of processing long indels and RNA-seq. Pure Java; runs on any platform. Used by the Joint Genome Institute.	Yes	Yes	Yes	Yes	Free, BSD		2010	
BFAST	Explicit time and accuracy tradeoff with a prior accuracy estimation, supported by indexing the reference sequences. Optimally compresses indexes. Can handle billions of short reads. Can handle insertions, deletions, SNPs, and color errors (can map ABI SOLiD color space reads). Performs a full Smith Waterman alignment.				Yes, POSIX Threads	Free, GPL		2009	
BigBWA	Runs the Burrows–Wheeler Aligner-BWA on a Hadoop cluster. It supports the algorithms BWA-MEM, BWA-ALN, and BWA-SW, working with paired and single reads. It implies an important reduction in the computational time when running in a Hadoop cluster, adding scalability and fault-tolerance.	Yes	Low quality bases trimming	Yes	Yes	Free, GPL 3		2015	
BLASTN	BLAST's nucleotide alignment program, slow and not accurate for short reads, and uses a sequence database (EST, Sanger sequence) rather than a reference genome.								
BLAT	Made by Jim Kent. Can handle one mismatch in initial alignment step.				Yes, client-server	Proprietary, freeware for academic and noncommercial use		2002	
Bowtie	Uses a Burrows–Wheeler transform to create a permanent, reusable index of the genome; 1.3 GB memory footprint for human genome. Aligns more than 25 million Illumina reads in 1 CPU hour. Supports Maq-like and SOAP-like alignment policies	Yes	Yes	No	Yes, POSIX Threads	Free, Artistic		2009	
BWA	Uses a Burrows–Wheeler transform to create an index of the genome. It's a bit slower than Bowtie but allows indels in alignment.	Yes	Low quality bases trimming	Yes	Yes	Free, GPL		2009	
BWA-PSSM	A probabilistic short read aligner based on the use of position specific scoring matrices (PSSM). The aligner is adaptable in the sense that it can take into account the quality scores of the reads and models of data specific biases, such as those observed in Ancient DNA, PAR-CLIP data or genomes with biased nucleotide compositions.	Yes	Yes	Yes	Yes	Free, GPL		2014	
CASHX	Quantify and manage large quantities of short-read sequence data. CASHX pipeline contains a set of tools that can be used together, or separately as modules. This algorithm is very accurate for perfect hits to a reference genome.				No	Proprietary, freeware for academic and noncommercial use			
Cloudburst	Short-read mapping using Hadoop MapReduce				Yes, Hadoop MapReduce	Free, Artistic			
CodonCode Aligner	Fast assembly, accurate consensus sequences with support for quality scores. Compare Contigs, Phred, Phrap, and Bowtie support. Build separate contigs for hundreds of different clones or a single contig with thousands of sequences.	Yes	Yes	Yes	Yes	Proprietary, commercial			
CUDA-EC	Short-read alignment error correction using GPUs.				Yes, GPU enabled				
CUSHAW	A CUDA compatible short read aligner to large genomes based on Burrows–Wheeler transform	Yes	Yes	No	Yes (GPU enabled)	Free, GPL		2012	
CUSHAW2	Gapped short-read and long-read alignment based on maximal exact match seeds. This aligner supports both base-space (e.g. from Illumina, 454, Ion Torrent and PacBio sequencers) and ABI SOLiD color-space read alignments.	Yes	No	Yes	Yes	Free, GPL		2014	
CUSHAW2-GPU	GPU-accelerated CUSHAW2 short-read aligner.	Yes	No	Yes	Yes	Free, GPL			
CUSHAW3	Sensitive and accurate base-space and color-space short-read alignment with hybrid seeding	Yes	No	Yes	Yes	Free, GPL		2012	
drFAST	Read mapping alignment software that implements cache obliviousness to minimize main/cache memory transfers like mrFAST and mrsFAST, however designed for the SOLiD sequencing platform (color space reads). It also returns all possible map locations for improved structural variation discovery.	Yes	Yes, for structural variation	Yes	No	Free, BSD			
ELAND	Implemented by Illumina. Includes ungapped alignment with a finite read length.								
ERNE	Extended Randomized Numerical alignEr for accurate alignment of NGS reads. It can map bisulfite-treated reads.	Yes	Low quality bases trimming	Yes	Multithreading and MPI-enabled	Free, GPL 3			
GASSST	Finds global alignments of short DNA sequences against large DNA banks				Multithreading	CeCILL version 2 License.		2011	
GEM	High-quality alignment engine (exhaustive mapping with substitutions and indels). More accurate and several times faster than BWA or Bowtie 1/2. Many standalone biological applications (mapper, split mapper, mappability, and other) provided.	Yes	Yes	Yes	Yes	Free, GPL3		2012	
Genalice MAP	Ultra fast and comprehensive NGS read aligner with high precision and small storage footprint.	Yes	Low quality bases trimming	Yes	Yes	Proprietary, commercial			
Geneious Assembler	Fast, accurate overlap assembler with the ability to handle any combination of sequencing technology, read length, any pairing orientations, with any spacer size for the pairing, with or without a reference genome.				Yes	Proprietary, commercial			
GensearchNGS	Complete framework with user-friendly GUI to analyse NGS data. It integrates a proprietary high quality alignment algorithm and plug-in ability to integrate various public aligner into a framework allowing to import short reads, align them, detect variants, and generate reports. It is made for resequencing projects, namely in a diagnostic setting.	Yes	No	Yes	Yes	Proprietary, commercial			
GMAP and GSNAP	Robust, fast short-read alignment. GMAP: longer reads, with multiple indels and splices (see entry above under Genomics analysis); GSNAP: shorter reads, with one indel or up to two splices per read. Useful for digital gene expression, SNP and indel genotyping. Developed by Thomas Wu at Genentech. Used by the National Center for Genome Resources (NCGR) in Alpheus.	Yes	Yes	Yes	Yes	Proprietary, freeware for academic and noncommercial use			
GNUMAP	Accurately performs gapped alignment of sequence data obtained from next-generation sequencing machines (specifically of Solexa-Illumina) back to a genome of any size. Includes adaptor trimming, SNP calling and Bisulfite sequence analysis.		Yes, also supports Illumina *_int.txt and *_prb.txt files with all 4 quality scores for each base		Multithreading and MPI-enabled			2009	
HIVE-hexagon	Uses a hash table and bloom matrix to create and filter potential positions on the genome. For higher efficiency uses cross-similarity between short reads and avoids realigning non unique redundant sequences. It is faster than Bowtie and BWA and allows indels and divergent sensitive alignments on viruses, bacteria, and more conservative eukaryotic alignments.	Yes	Yes	Yes	Yes	Proprietary, freeware for academic and noncommercial users registered to HIVE deployment instance		2014	
IMOS	Improved Meta-aligner and Minimap2 On Spark. A long read distributed aligner on Apache Spark platform with linear scalability w.r.t. single node execution.		Yes	Yes	Yes	Free			
Isaac	Fully uses all the computing power available on one server node; thus, it scales well over a broad range of hardware architectures, and alignment performance improves with hardware abilities	Yes	Yes	Yes	Yes	Free, GPL			
LAST	Uses adaptative seeds and copes more efficiently with repeat-rich sequences (e.g. genomes). For example: it can align reads to genomes without repeat-masking, without becoming overwhelmed by repetitive hits.	Yes	Yes	Yes	Yes	Free, GPL		2011	
MAQ	Ungapped alignment that takes into account quality scores for each base.					Free, GPL			
mrFAST, mrsFAST	Gapped (mrFAST) and ungapped (mrsFAST) alignment software that implements cache obliviousness to minimize main/cache memory transfers. They are designed for the Illumina sequencing platform and they can return all possible map locations for improved structural variation discovery.	Yes	Yes, for structural variation	Yes	No	Free, BSD			
MOM	MOM or maximum oligonucleotide mapping is a query matching tool that captures a maximal length match within the short read.				Yes				
MOSAIK	Fast gapped aligner and reference-guided assembler. Aligns reads using a banded Smith-Waterman algorithm seeded by results from a k-mer hashing scheme. Supports reads ranging in size from very short to very long.				Yes				
MPscan	Fast aligner based on a filtration strategy (no indexing, use q-grams and Backward Nondeterministic DAWG Matching)							2009	
Novoalign & NovoalignCS	Gapped alignment of single end and paired end Illumina GA I & II, ABI Colour space & ION Torrent reads. High sensitivity and specificity, using base qualities at all steps in the alignment. Includes adapter trimming, base quality calibration, Bi-Seq alignment, and options for reporting multiple alignments per read. Use of ambiguous IUPAC codes in reference for common SNPs can improve SNP recall and remove allelic bias.	Yes	Yes	Yes	Multi-threading and MPI versions available with paid license	Proprietary, freeware single threaded version for academic and noncommercial use			
NextGENe	Developed for use by biologists performing analysis of next generation sequencing data from Roche Genome Sequencer FLX, Illumina GA/HiSeq, Life Technologies Applied BioSystems' SOLiD System, PacBio and Ion Torrent platforms.	Yes	Yes	Yes	Yes	Proprietary, commercial			
NextGenMap	Flexible and fast read mapping program (twice as fast as BWA), achieves a mapping sensitivity comparable to Stampy. Internally uses a memory efficient index structure (hash table) to store positions of all 13-mers present in the reference genome. Mapping regions where pairwise alignments are required are dynamically determined for each read. Uses fast SIMD instructions (SSE) to accelerate alignment calculations on CPU. If available, alignments are computed on GPU (using OpenCL/CUDA) further reducing runtime 20-50%.	Yes	No	Yes	Yes, POSIX Threads, OpenCL/CUDA, SSE	Free		2013	
Omixon Variant Toolkit	Includes highly sensitive and highly accurate tools for detecting SNPs and indels. It offers a solution to map NGS short reads with a moderate distance (up to 30% sequence divergence) from reference genomes. It poses no restrictions on the size of the reference, which, combined with its high sensitivity, makes the Variant Toolkit well-suited for targeted sequencing projects and diagnostics.	Yes	Yes	Yes	Yes	Proprietary, commercial			
PALMapper	Efficiently computes both spliced and unspliced alignments at high accuracy. Relying on a machine learning strategy combined with a fast mapping based on a banded Smith-Waterman-like algorithm, it aligns around 7 million reads per hour on one CPU. It refines the originally proposed QPALMA approach.				Yes	Free, GPL			
Partek Flow	For use by biologists and bioinformaticians. It supports ungapped, gapped and splice-junction alignment from single and paired-end reads from Illumina, Life technologies Solid TM, Roche 454 and Ion Torrent raw data (with or without quality information). It integrates powerful quality control on FASTQ/Qual level and on aligned data. Additional functionality include trimming and filtering of raw reads, SNP and InDel detection, mRNA and microRNA quantification and fusion gene detection.	Yes	Yes	Yes	Multiprocessor-core, client-server installation possible	Proprietary, commercial, free trial version			
PASS	Indexes the genome, then extends seeds using pre-computed alignments of words. Works with base space, color space (SOLID), and can align genomic and spliced RNA-seq reads.	Yes	Yes	Yes	Yes	Proprietary, freeware for academic and noncommercial use			
PerM	Indexes the genome with periodic seeds to quickly find alignments with full sensitivity up to four mismatches. It can map Illumina and SOLiD reads. Unlike most mapping programs, speed increases for longer read lengths.				Yes	Free, GPL			
PRIMEX	Indexes the genome with a k-mer lookup table with full sensitivity up to an adjustable number of mismatches. It is best for mapping 15-60 bp sequences to a genome.	No	No	Yes	No, multiple processes per search			2003	
QPalma	Can use quality scores, intron lengths, and computation splice site predictions to perform and performs an unbiased alignment. Can be trained to the specifics of a RNA-seq experiment and genome. Useful for splice site/intron discovery and for gene model building. (See PALMapper for a faster version).				Yes, client-server	Free, GPL 2			
RazerS	No read length limit. Hamming or edit distance mapping with configurable error rates. Configurable and predictable sensitivity (runtime/sensitivity tradeoff). Supports paired-end read mapping.					Free, LGPL			
REAL, cREAL	REAL is an efficient, accurate, and sensitive tool for aligning short reads obtained from next-generation sequencing. The programme can handle an enormous amount of single-end reads generated by the next-generation Illumina/Solexa Genome Analyzer. cREAL is a simple extension of REAL for aligning short reads obtained from next-generation sequencing to a genome with circular structure.		Yes		Yes	Free, GPL			
RMAP	Can map reads with or without error probability information (quality scores) and supports paired-end reads or bisulfite-treated read mapping. There are no limitations on read length or number of mismatches.	Yes	Yes	Yes		Free, GPL 3			
rNA	A randomized Numerical Aligner for Accurate alignment of NGS reads	Yes	Low quality bases trimming	Yes	Multithreading and MPI-enabled	Free, GPL 3			
RTG Investigator	Extremely fast, tolerant to high indel and substitution counts. Includes full read alignment. Product includes comprehensive pipelines for variant detection and metagenomic analysis with any combination of Illumina, Complete Genomics and Roche 454 data.	Yes	Yes, for variant calling	Yes	Yes	Proprietary, freeware for individual investigator use			
Segemehl	Can handle insertions, deletions, mismatches; uses enhanced suffix arrays	Yes	No	Yes	Yes	Proprietary, freeware for noncommercial use		2009	
SeqMap	Up to 5 mixed substitutions and insertions-deletions; various tuning options and input-output formats					Proprietary, freeware for academic and noncommercial use			
Shrec	Short read error correction with a suffix tree data structure				Yes, Java				
SHRiMP	Indexes the reference genome as of version 2. Uses masks to generate possible keys. Can map ABI SOLiD color space reads.	Yes	Yes	Yes	Yes, OpenMP	Free, [[BSD licenses	Free, BSD]] derivative		2009-2011
SLIDER	Slider is an application for the Illumina Sequence Analyzer output that uses the "probability" files instead of the sequence files as an input for alignment to a reference sequence or a set of reference sequences.	Yes	Yes	No	No			2009-2010	
SOAP, SOAP2, SOAP3, SOAP3-dp	SOAP: robust with a small (1-3) number of gaps and mismatches. Speed improvement over BLAT, uses a 12 letter hash table. SOAP2: using bidirectional BWT to build the index of reference, and it is much faster than the first version. SOAP3: GPU-accelerated version that could find all 4-mismatch alignments in tens of seconds per one million reads. SOAP3-dp, also GPU accelerated, supports arbitrary number of mismatches and gaps according to affine gap penalty scores.	Yes	No	Yes, SOAP3-dp	Yes, POSIX Threads; SOAP3, SOAP3-dp need GPU with CUDA support	Free, GPL			
SOCS	For ABI SOLiD technologies. Significant increase in time to map reads with mismatches (or color errors). Uses an iterative version of the Rabin-Karp string search algorithm.				Yes	Free, GPL			
SparkBWA	Integrates the Burrows–Wheeler Aligner (BWA) on an Apache Spark framework running atop Hadoop. Version 0.2 of October 2016, supports the algorithms BWA-MEM, BWA-backtrack, and BWA-ALN. All of them work with single-reads and paired-end reads.	Yes	Low quality bases trimming	Yes	Yes	Free, GPL 3		2016	
SSAHA, SSAHA2	Fast for a small number of variants					Proprietary, freeware for academic and noncommercial use			
Stampy	For Illumina reads. High specificity, and sensitive for reads with indels, structural variants, or many SNPs. Slow, but speed increased dramatically by using BWA for first alignment pass.	Yes	Yes	Yes	No	Proprietary, freeware for academic and noncommercial use		2010	
SToRM	For Illumina or ABI SOLiD reads, with SAM native output. Highly sensitive for reads with many errors, indels (full from 0 to 15, extended support otherwise). Uses spaced seeds (single hit) and a very fast SSE-SSE2-AVX2-AVX-512 banded alignment filter. For fixed-length reads only, authors recommend SHRiMP2 otherwise.	No	Yes	Yes	Yes, OpenMP	Free		2010	
Subread, Subjunc	Superfast and accurate read aligners. Subread can be used to map both gDNA-seq and RNA-seq reads. Subjunc detects exon-exon junctions and maps RNA-seq reads. They employ a novel mapping paradigm named seed-and-vote.	Yes	Yes	Yes	Yes	Free, GPL 3			
Taipan	De-novo assembler for Illumina reads					Proprietary, freeware for academic and noncommercial use			
UGENE	Visual interface both for Bowtie and BWA, and an embedded aligner	Yes	Yes	Yes	Yes	Free, GPL			
VelociMapper	FPGA-accelerated reference sequence alignment mapping tool from TimeLogic. Faster than Burrows–Wheeler transform-based algorithms like BWA and Bowtie. Supports up to 7 mismatches and/or indels with no performance penalty. Produces sensitive Smith–Waterman gapped alignments.	Yes	Yes	Yes	Yes	Proprietary, commercial			
XpressAlign	FPGA based sliding window short read aligner which exploits the embarrassingly parallel property of short read alignment. Performance scales linearly with number of transistors on a chip (i.e. performance guaranteed to double with each iteration of Moore's Law without modification to algorithm). Low power consumption is useful for datacentre equipment. Predictable runtime. Better price/performance than software sliding window aligners on current hardware, but not better than software BWT-based aligners currently. Can manage large numbers (>2) of mismatches. Will find all hit positions for all seeds. Single-FPGA experimental version, needs work to develop it into a multi-FPGA production version.					Proprietary, freeware for academic and noncommercial use			
ZOOM	100% sensitivity for a reads between 15 and 240 bp with practical mismatches. Very fast. Support insertions and deletions. Works with Illumina & SOLiD instruments, not 454.				Yes (GUI), no (CLI)	Proprietary, commercial			

== See also ==
- List of open source bioinformatics software
