= Yass =

Yass may refer to:

== People ==
- Catherine Yass (born 1963), painter
- Jeff Yass (born 1958), options trader, managing director and one of the five founders of the Philadelphia-based Susquehanna International

== Places ==
- Yass, New South Wales, a town in Australia
- Municipality of Yass, original local government for the town until 1980
- Yass Valley Council, a local government area (shire) in New South Wales since 2004
- Yass Valley Way, the main road through Yass that was part of the Hume Highway before a bypass was constructed in the 1990s
- Yass River, a river in the state of New South Wales, Australia

== Other uses ==
- Yass (software), a genomic local alignment tool
- YASS (programming language), a programming language designed to be easy to learn
- Yass (music), a style of Polish jazz music from the 1980s and 1990s
- Yas (slang), a form of the word "yes" in LGBT slang

== See also ==
- Jass, a card game
- Yazz, a British pop singer
