= DIALIGN-TX =

Software for sequence alignment

DIALIGN-TX is a multiple sequence alignment program written by Amarendran R. Subramanian and is substantial improvement of DIALIGN-T by combining greedy and progressive alignment strategies in a new algorithm.

The original DIALIGN-T is a reimplementation of the multiple-alignment program DIALIGN. Due to several algorithmic improvements, it produces significantly better alignments on locally and globally related sequence sets than previous versions of DIALIGN. However, like the original implementation of the program, DIALIGN-T uses a straightforward greedy approach to assemble multiple alignments from local pairwise sequence similarities. Such greedy approaches may be vulnerable to spurious random similarities and can therefore lead to suboptimal results. DIALIGN-TX is a substantial improvement of DIALIGN-T that combines the previous greedy algorithm with a progressive alignment approach.

== See also ==
- DIALIGN-T
- Sequence alignment software
- Clustal
