= Align-m =

Align-m is a multiple sequence alignment program written by Ivo Van Walle.

Align-m has the ability to accomplish the following tasks:

- multiple sequence alignment,
- include extra information to guide the sequence alignment,
- multiple structural alignment,
- homology modeling by (iteratively) combining sequence and structure alignment data,
- 'filtering' of BLAST or other pairwise alignments,
- combining many alignments into one consensus sequence,
- multiple genome alignment (can cope with rearrangements).

== See also ==
- Sequence alignment software
- Clustal
