= Plant Genome Mapping Laboratory =

The Plant Genome Mapping Laboratory (PGML) is a department of the University of Georgia, directed by Dr. Andrew H. Paterson. Research focuses on the study of major crop species such as sorghum and cotton, as well as other species such as Bermuda Grass, Brassica and Peanut. Research topics include whole genome genetic mapping and physical mapping; polyploidy; ancient whole genome duplications; comparative genomics; gene cloning; drought tolerance; seed shattering and cotton fiber qualities. PGML has led in the sequencing of the sorghum genome and the cotton genome.
