= Comparative genomics =

Field of biological research

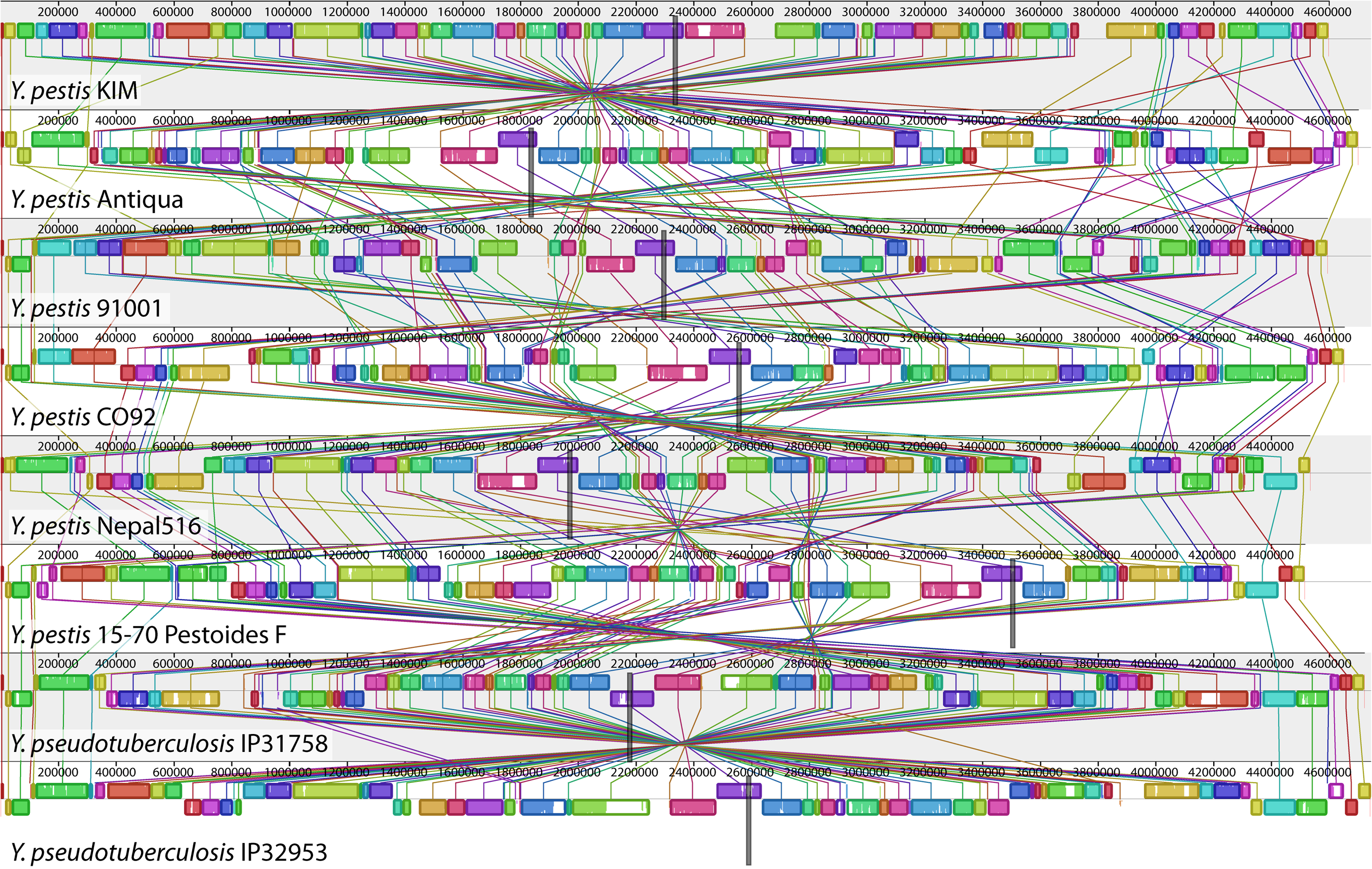
Whole genome alignment is a typical method in comparative genomics. This alignment of eight Yersinia bacteria genomes reveals 78 locally collinear blocks conserved among all eight taxa. Each chromosome has been laid out horizontally and homologous blocks in each genome are shown as identically colored regions linked across genomes. Regions that are inverted relative to Y. pestis KIM are shifted below a genome's center axis.

Comparative genomics is a branch of biological research that examines genome sequences across a spectrum of species, spanning from humans and mice to a diverse array of organisms from bacteria to chimpanzees. This large-scale holistic approach compares two or more genomes to discover the similarities and differences between the genomes and to study the biology of the individual genomes. Comparison of whole genome sequences provides a highly detailed view of how organisms are related to each other at the gene level. By comparing whole genome sequences, researchers gain insights into genetic relationships between organisms and study evolutionary changes. The major principle of comparative genomics is that common features of two organisms will often be encoded within the DNA that is evolutionarily conserved between them. Therefore, Comparative genomics provides a powerful tool for studying evolutionary changes among organisms, helping to identify genes that are conserved or common among species, as well as genes that give unique characteristics of each organism. Moreover, these studies can be performed at different levels of the genomes to obtain multiple perspectives about the organisms.

The comparative genomic analysis begins with a simple comparison of the general features of genomes such as genome size, number of genes, and chromosome number. Table 1 presents data on several fully sequenced model organisms, and highlights some striking findings. For instance, while the tiny flowering plant Arabidopsis thaliana has a smaller genome than that of the fruit fly Drosophila melanogaster (157 million base pairs v. 165 million base pairs, respectively) it possesses nearly twice as many genes (25,000 v. 13,000). In fact, A. thaliana has approximately the same number of genes as humans (25,000). Thus, a very early lesson learned in the genomic era is that genome size does not correlate with evolutionary status, nor is the number of genes proportionate to genome size.

Table 1: Comparative genome sizes of humans and other model organisms
Organism	Estimated size (base pairs)	Chromosome number	Estimated gene number
Human (Homo sapiens)	3.1 billion	46	25,000
Mouse (Mus musculus)	2.9 billion	40	25,000
Bovine (Bos taurus)	2.86 billion	60	22,000
Fruit fly (Drosophila melanogaster)	165 million	8	13,000
Plant (Arabidopsis thaliana)	157 million	10	25,000
Roundworm (Caenorhabditis elegans)	97 million	12	19,000
Yeast (Saccharomyces cerevisiae)	12 million	32	6,000
Bacteria (Escherichia coli)	4.6 million	1	3,200

In comparative genomics, synteny is the preserved order of genes on chromosomes of related species indicating their descent from a common ancestor. Synteny provides a framework in which the conservation of homologous genes and gene order is identified between genomes of different species. Synteny blocks are more formally defined as regions of chromosomes between genomes that share a common order of homologous genes derived from a common ancestor. Alternative names such as conserved synteny or collinearity have been used interchangeably. Comparisons of genome synteny between and within species have provided an opportunity to study evolutionary processes that lead to the diversity of chromosome number and structure in many lineages across the tree of life; early discoveries using such approaches include chromosomal conserved regions in nematodes and yeast, evolutionary history and phenotypic traits of extremely conserved Hox gene clusters across animals and MADS-box gene family in plants, and karyotype evolution in mammals and plants.

Furthermore, comparing two genomes not only reveals conserved domains or synteny but also aids in detecting copy number variations, single nucleotide polymorphisms (SNPs), indels, and other genomic structural variations.

Virtually started as soon as the whole genomes of two organisms became available (that is, the genomes of the bacteria Haemophilus influenzae and Mycoplasma genitalium) in 1995, comparative genomics is now a standard component of the analysis of every new genome sequence. With the explosion in the number of genome projects due to the advancements in DNA sequencing technologies, particularly the next-generation sequencing methods in late 2000s, this field has become more sophisticated, making it possible to deal with many genomes in a single study. Comparative genomics has revealed high levels of similarity between closely related organisms, such as humans and chimpanzees, and, more surprisingly, similarity between seemingly distantly related organisms, such as humans and the yeast Saccharomyces cerevisiae. It has also showed the extreme diversity of the gene composition in different evolutionary lineages.

== History ==
Comparative genomics has a root in the comparison of virus genomes in the early 1980s. For example, small RNA viruses infecting animals (picornaviruses) and those infecting plants (cowpea mosaic virus) were compared and turned out to share significant sequence similarity and, in part, the order of their genes. In 1986, the first comparative genomic study at a larger scale was published, comparing the genomes of varicella-zoster virus and Epstein-Barr virus that contained more than 100 genes each.

The first complete genome sequence of a cellular organism, that of Haemophilus influenzae Rd, was published in 1995. The second genome sequencing paper was of the small parasitic bacterium Mycoplasma genitalium published in the same year. Starting from this paper, reports on new genomes inevitably became comparative-genomic studies.

Microbial genomes. The first high-resolution whole genome comparison system of microbial genomes of 10-15kbp was developed in 1998 by Art Delcher, Simon Kasif and Steven Salzberg and applied to the comparison of entire highly related microbial organisms with their collaborators at the Institute for Genomic Research (TIGR). The system is called MUMMER and was described in a publication in Nucleic Acids Research in 1999. The system helps researchers to identify large rearrangements, single base mutations, reversals, tandem repeat expansions and other polymorphisms. In bacteria, MUMMER enables the identification of polymorphisms that are responsible for virulence, pathogenicity, and anti-biotic resistance. The system was also applied to the Minimal Organism Project at TIGR and subsequently to many other comparative genomics projects.

Eukaryote genomes. Saccharomyces cerevisiae, the baker's yeast, was the first eukaryote to have its complete genome sequence published in 1996. After the publication of the roundworm Caenorhabditis elegans genome in 1998 and together with the fruit fly Drosophila melanogaster genome in 2000, Gerald M. Rubin and his team published a paper titled "Comparative Genomics of the Eukaryotes", in which they compared the genomes of the eukaryotes D. melanogaster, C. elegans, and S. cerevisiae, as well as the prokaryote H. influenzae. At the same time, Bonnie Berger, Eric Lander, and their team published a paper on whole-genome comparison of human and mouse.

With the publication of the large genomes of vertebrates in the 2000s, including human, the Japanese pufferfish Takifugu rubripes, and mouse, precomputed results of large genome comparisons have been released for downloading or for visualization in a genome browser. Instead of undertaking their own analyses, most biologists can access these large cross-species comparisons and avoid the impracticality caused by the size of the genomes.

Next-generation sequencing methods, which were first introduced in 2007, have produced an enormous amount of genomic data and have allowed researchers to generate multiple (prokaryotic) draft genome sequences at once. These methods can also quickly uncover single-nucleotide polymorphisms, insertions and deletions by mapping unassembled reads against a well annotated reference genome, and thus provide a list of possible gene differences that may be the basis for any functional variation among strains.

== Evolutionary principles ==
One character of biology is evolution, evolutionary theory is also the theoretical foundation of comparative genomics, and at the same time the results of comparative genomics unprecedentedly enriched and developed the theory of evolution. When two or more of the genome sequence are compared, one can deduce the evolutionary relationships of the sequences in a phylogenetic tree. Based on a variety of biological genome data and the study of vertical and horizontal evolution processes, one can understand vital parts of the gene structure and its regulatory function.

Similarity of related genomes is the basis of comparative genomics. If two creatures have a recent common ancestor, the differences between the two species genomes are evolved from the ancestors' genome. The closer the relationship between two organisms, the higher the similarities between their genomes. If there is close relationship between them, then their genome will display a linear behaviour (synteny), namely some or all of the genetic sequences are conserved. Thus, the genome sequences can be used to identify gene function, by analyzing their homology (sequence similarity) to genes of known function.

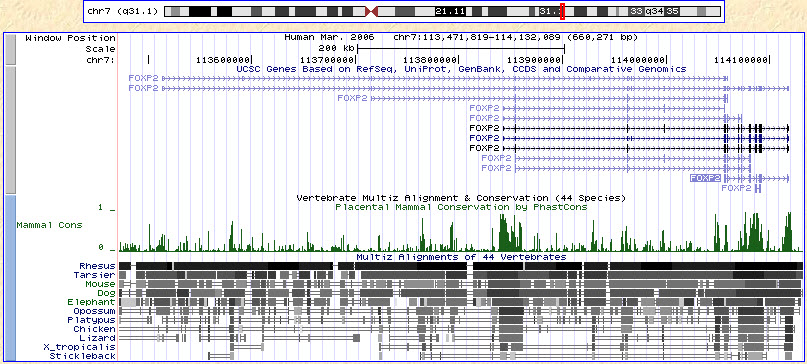
Human FOXP2 gene and evolutionary conservation is shown in and multiple alignment (at bottom of figure) in this image from the UCSC Genome Browser. Note that conservation tends to cluster around coding regions (exons).

Orthologous sequences are related sequences in different species: a gene exists in the original species, the species divided into two species, so genes in new species are orthologous to the sequence in the original species. Paralogous sequences are separated by gene cloning (gene duplication): if a particular gene in the genome is copied, then the copy of the two sequences is paralogous to the original gene. A pair of orthologous sequences is called orthologous pairs (orthologs), a pair of paralogous sequence is called collateral pairs (paralogs). Orthologous pairs usually have the same or similar function, which is not necessarily the case for collateral pairs. In collateral pairs, the sequences tend to evolve into having different functions.

Comparative genomics exploits both similarities and differences in the proteins, RNA, and regulatory regions of different organisms to infer how selection has acted upon these elements. Those elements that are responsible for similarities between different species should be conserved through time (stabilizing selection), while those elements responsible for differences among species should be divergent (positive selection). Finally, those elements that are unimportant to the evolutionary success of the organism will be unconserved (selection is neutral).

One of the important goals of the field is the identification of the mechanisms of eukaryotic genome evolution. It is however often complicated by the multiplicity of events that have taken place throughout the history of individual lineages, leaving only distorted and superimposed traces in the genome of each living organism. For this reason comparative genomics studies of small model organisms (for example the model Caenorhabditis elegans and closely related Caenorhabditis briggsae) are of great importance to advance our understanding of general mechanisms of evolution.

== Role of CNVs in evolution ==
Comparative genomics plays a crucial role in identifying copy number variations (CNVs) and understanding their significance in evolution. CNVs, which involve deletions or duplications of large segments of DNA, are recognized as a major source of genetic diversity, influencing gene structure, dosage, and regulation. While single nucleotide polymorphisms (SNPs) are more common, CNVs impact larger genomic regions and can have profound effects on phenotype and diversity. Recent studies suggest that CNVs constitute around 4.8–9.5% of the human genome and have a substantial functional and evolutionary impact. In mammals, CNVs contribute significantly to population diversity, influencing gene expression and various phenotypic traits. Comparative genomics analyses of human and chimpanzee genomes have revealed that CNVs may play a greater role in evolutionary change compared to single nucleotide changes. Research indicates that CNVs affect more nucleotides than individual base-pair changes, with about 2.7% of the genome affected by CNVs compared to 1.2% by SNPs. Moreover, while many CNVs are shared between humans and chimpanzees, a significant portion is unique to each species. Additionally, CNVs have been associated with genetic diseases in humans, highlighting their importance in human health. Despite this, many questions about CNVs remain unanswered, including their origin and contributions to evolutionary adaptation and disease. Ongoing research aims to address these questions using techniques like comparative genomic hybridization, which allows for a detailed examination of CNVs and their significance. When investigators examined the raw sequence data of the human and chimpanzee.

== Significance of comparative genomics ==
Comparative genomics holds profound significance across various fields, including medical research, basic biology, and biodiversity conservation. For instance, in medical research, predicting how genomic variants limited ability to predict which genomic variants lead to changes in organism-level phenotypes, such as increased disease risk in humans, remains challenging due to the immense size of the genome, comprising about three billion nucleotides.

To tackle this challenge, comparative genomics offers a solution by pinpointing nucleotide positions that have remained unchanged over millions of years of evolution. These conserved regions indicate potential sites where genetic alterations could have detrimental effects on an organism's fitness, thus guiding the search for disease-causing variants. Moreover, comparative genomics holds promise in unraveling the mechanisms of gene evolution, environmental adaptations, gender-specific differences, and population variations across vertebrate lineages.

Furthermore, comparative studies enable the identification of genomic signatures of selection—regions in the genome that have undergone preferential increase and fixation in populations due to their functional significance in specific processes. For instance, in animal genetics, indigenous cattle exhibit superior disease resistance and environmental adaptability but lower productivity compared to exotic breeds. Through comparative genomic analyses, significant genomic signatures responsible for these unique traits can be identified. Using insights from this signature, breeders can make informed decisions to enhance breeding strategies and promote breed development.

== Methods ==
Computational approaches are necessary for genome comparisons, given the large amount of data encoded in genomes. Many tools are now publicly available, ranging from whole genome comparisons to gene expression analysis. This includes approaches from systems and control, information theory, string analysis and data mining. Computational approaches will remain critical for research and teaching, especially when information science and genome biology is taught in conjunction. Pangenome analysis is another comparative-genomics method: in presence-absence pangenomes, genes are divided into a core genome shared by all sampled members of a population and an accessory genome present in only some members. In microbial comparative genomics, comparative pangenomics can use this core-versus-accessory structure to relate gene-content variation to clinically relevant traits such as virulence and antimicrobial resistance.

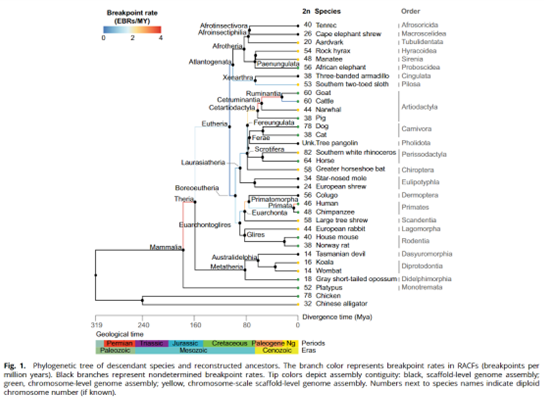
Phylogenetic tree of descendant species and reconstructed ancestors. The branch color represents breakpoint rates in RACFs (breakpoints per million years). Black branches represent nondetermined breakpoint rates. Tip colors depict assembly contiguity: black, scaffold-level genome assembly; green, chromosome-level genome assembly; yellow, chromosome-scale scaffold-level genome assembly. Numbers next to species names indicate diploid chromosome number (if known).

Comparative genomics starts with basic comparisons of genome size and gene density. For instance, genome size is important for coding capacity and possibly for regulatory reasons. High gene density facilitates genome annotation, analysis of environmental selection. By contrast, low gene density hampers the mapping of genetic disease as in the human genome.

=== Sequence alignment ===
Alignments are used to capture information about similar sequences such as ancestry, common evolutionary descent, or common structure and function. Alignments can be done for both nucleotide and protein sequences. Alignments consist of local or global pairwise alignments, and multiple sequence alignments. One way to find global alignments is to use a dynamic programming algorithm known as Needleman-Wunsch algorithm whereas Smith–Waterman algorithm used to find local alignments. With the exponential growth of sequence databases and the emergence of longer sequences, there's a heightened interest in faster, approximate, or heuristic alignment procedures. Among these, the FASTA and BLAST algorithms are prominent for local pairwise alignment. Recent years have witnessed the development of programs tailored to aligning lengthy sequences, such as MUMmer (1999), BLASTZ (2003), and AVID (2003). While BLASTZ adopts a local approach, MUMmer and AVID are geared towards global alignment. To harness the benefits of both local and global alignment approaches, one effective strategy involves integrating them. Initially, a rapid variant of BLAST known as BLAT is employed to identify homologous "anchor" regions. These anchors are subsequently scrutinized to identify sets exhibiting conserved order and orientation. Such sets of anchors are then subjected to alignment using a global strategy.

Additionally, ongoing efforts focus on optimizing existing algorithms to handle the vast amount of genome sequence data by enhancing their speed. Furthermore, MAVID stands out as another noteworthy pairwise alignment program specifically designed for aligning multiple genomes.

Pairwise Comparison: The Pairwise comparison of genomic sequence data is widely utilized in comparative gene prediction. Many studies in comparative functional genomics lean on pairwise comparisons, wherein traits of each gene are compared with traits of other genes across species. his method yields many more comparisons than unique observations, making each comparison dependent on others.

Multiple comparisons: The comparison of multiple genomes is a natural extension of pairwise inter-specific comparisons. Such comparisons typically aim to identify conserved regions across two phylogenetic scales: 1. Deep comparisons, often referred to as phylogenetic footprinting reveal conservation across higher taxonomic units like vertebrates. 2. Shallow comparisons, recently termed Phylogenetic shadowing, probe conservation across a group of closely related species.

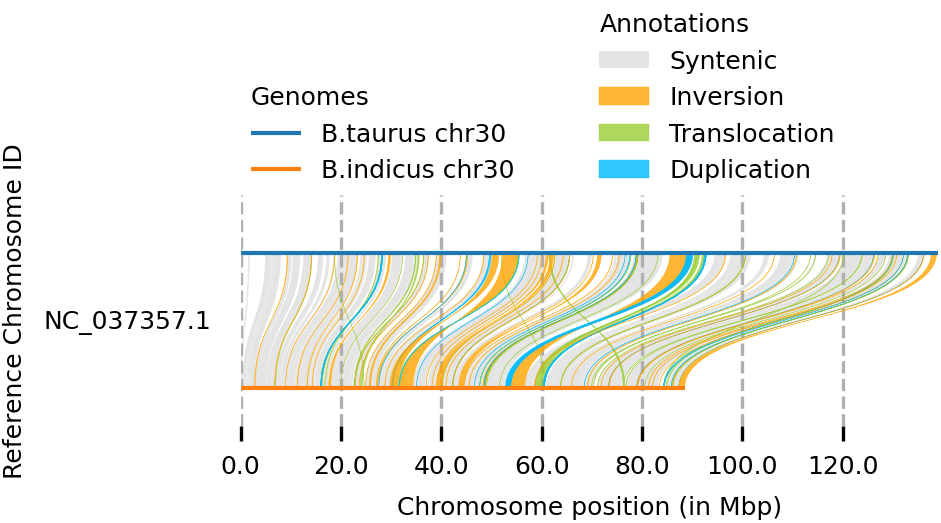
Chromosome by chromosome variation of indicine and taurine cattle. The genomic structural differences on chromosome X between indicine (Bos indicus – Nelore cattle) and taurine cattle (Bos taurus – Hereford cattle) were identified using the SyRI tool.

=== Whole-genome alignment ===
Whole-genome alignment (WGA) involves predicting evolutionary relationships at the nucleotide level between two or more genomes. It integrates elements of colinear sequence alignment and gene orthology prediction, presenting a greater challenge due to the vast size and intricate nature of whole genomes. Despite its complexity, numerous methods have emerged to tackle this problem because WGAs play a crucial role in various genome-wide analyses, such as phylogenetic inference, genome annotation, and function prediction. Thereby, SyRI (Synteny and Rearrangement Identifier) is one such method that utilizes whole genome alignment and it is designed to identify both structural and sequence differences between two whole-genome assemblies. By taking WGAs as input, SyRI initially scans for disparities in genome structures. Subsequently, it identifies local sequence variations within both rearranged and non-rearranged (syntenic) regions.

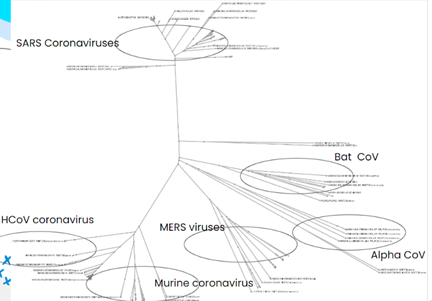
Example of a phylogenetic tree created from an alignment of 250 unique spike protein sequences from the Betacoronavirus family.

=== Phylogenetic reconstruction ===
Another computational method for comparative genomics is phylogenetic reconstruction. It is used to describe evolutionary relationships in terms of common ancestors. The relationships are usually represented in a tree called a phylogenetic tree. Similarly, coalescent theory is a retrospective model to trace alleles of a gene in a population to a single ancestral copy shared by members of the population. This is also known as the most recent common ancestor. Analysis based on coalescence theory tries predicting the amount of time between the introduction of a mutation and a particular allele or gene distribution in a population. This time period is equal to how long ago the most recent common ancestor existed. The inheritance relationships are visualized in a form similar to a phylogenetic tree. Coalescence (or the gene genealogy) can be visualized using dendrograms.

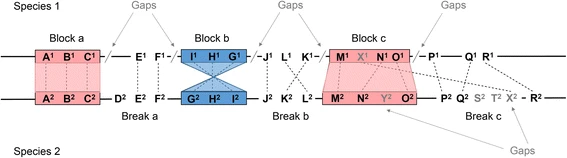
Example of synteny block and break. Genes located on chromosomes of two species are denoted in letters. Each gene is associated with a number representing the species they belong to (species 1 or 2). Orthologous genes are connected by dashed lines and genes without an orthologous relationship are treated as gaps in synteny programs.

=== Genome maps ===
An additional method in comparative genomics is genetic mapping. In genetic mapping, visualizing synteny is one way to see the preserved order of genes on chromosomes. It is usually used for chromosomes of related species, both of which result from a common ancestor. This and other methods can shed light on evolutionary history. A recent study used comparative genomics to reconstruct 16 ancestral karyotypes across the mammalian phylogeny. The computational reconstruction showed how chromosomes rearranged themselves during mammal evolution. It gave insight into conservation of select regions often associated with the control of developmental processes. In addition, it helped to provide an understanding of chromosome evolution and genetic diseases associated with DNA rearrangements.

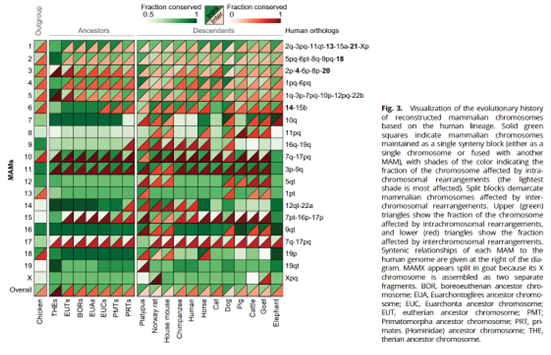
Image from the study Evolution of the ancestral mammalian karyotype and syntenic regions. It is a Visualization of the evolutionary history of reconstructed mammalian chromosomes based on the human lineage.

== Tools ==
Computational tools for analyzing sequences and complete genomes are developing quickly due to the availability of large amount of genomic data. At the same time, comparative analysis tools are progressed and improved. In the challenges about these analyses, it is very important to visualize the comparative results.

Visualizing sequence conservation is a challenging task of comparative sequence analysis, as manually examining alignments across long genomic regions is highly inefficient. Internet-based genome browsers address this by integrating sequence-based biological information into a single platform, offering tools that make large-scale genomic data easier to investigate. This integration allows relevant biological data to be extracted more efficiently, reducing the time and effort required for analysis.

- UCSC Browser: This site contains the reference sequence and working draft assemblies for a large collection of genomes.
- Ensembl: The Ensembl project produces genome databases for vertebrates and other eukaryotic species, and makes this information freely available online.
- MapView: The Map Viewer provides a wide variety of genome mapping and sequencing data.
- VISTA is a comprehensive suite of programs and databases for comparative analysis of genomic sequences. It was built to visualize the results of comparative analysis based on DNA alignments. The presentation of comparative data generated by VISTA can easily suit both small and large scale of data.
- BlueJay Genome Browser: A stand-alone visualization tool for the multi-scale viewing of annotated genomes and other genomic elements.
- SyRI: SyRI stands for Synteny and Rearrangement Identifier and is a versatile tool for comparative genomics, offering functionalities for synteny analysis and visualization, aiding in the prediction of genomic differences between related genomes using whole-genome assemblies (WGA).
- Synmap2: Specifically designed for synteny mapping, Synmap2 efficiently compares genetic maps or assemblies, providing insights into genome evolution and rearrangements among related organisms.
- GSAlign: GSAlign facilitates accurate alignment of genomic sequences, particularly useful for large-scale comparative genomics studies, enabling researchers to identify similarities and differences across genomes.
- IGV (Integrative Genomics Viewer): A widely used tool for visualizing and analyzing genomic data, IGV supports comparative genomics by enabling users to explore alignments, variants, and annotations across multiple genomes.
- Manta: Manta is a rapid structural variant caller, crucial for comparative genomics as it detects genomic rearrangements such as insertions, deletions, inversions, and duplications, aiding in understanding genetic variation among populations or species.
- CNVNatar: CNVNatar specializes in detecting copy number variations (CNVs), which are crucial in understanding genome evolution and population genetics, providing insights into genomic structural changes across different organisms.
- PIPMaker: PIPMaker facilitates the alignment and comparison of two genomic sequences, enabling the identification of conserved regions, duplications, and evolutionary breakpoints, aiding in comparative genomics analyses.
- GLASS (Genome-wide Location and Sequence Searcher): GLASS is a tool for identifying conserved regulatory elements across genomes, crucial for comparative genomics studies focusing on understanding gene regulation and evolution.
- PatternHunter: PatternHunter is a versatile tool for sequence analysis, offering functionalities for identifying conserved patterns, motifs, and repeats across genomic sequences, aiding in comparative genomics studies of gene families and regulatory elements.
- Mummer: Mummer is a suite of tools for whole-genome alignment and comparison, widely used in comparative genomics for identifying similarities, differences, and evolutionary events among genomes at various scales.

An advantage of using online tools is that these websites are being developed and updated constantly. There are many new settings and content can be used online to improve efficiency.

== Selected applications ==
=== Agriculture ===
Agriculture is a field that reaps the benefits of comparative genomics. Identifying the loci of advantageous genes is a key step in breeding crops that are optimized for greater yield, cost-efficiency, quality, and disease resistance. For example, one genome wide association study conducted on 517 rice landraces revealed 80 loci associated with several categories of agronomic performance, such as grain weight, amylose content, and drought tolerance. Many of the loci were previously uncharacterized. Not only is this methodology powerful, it is also quick. Previous methods of identifying loci associated with agronomic performance required several generations of carefully monitored breeding of parent strains, a time-consuming effort that is unnecessary for comparative genomic studies.

=== Medicine ===
==== Vaccine development ====
The medical field also benefits from the study of comparative genomics. In an approach known as reverse vaccinology, researchers can discover candidate antigens for vaccine development by analyzing the genome of a pathogen or a family of pathogens. Applying a comparative genomics approach by analyzing the genomes of several related pathogens can lead to the development of vaccines that are multi-protective. A team of researchers employed such an approach to create a universal vaccine for Group B Streptococcus, a group of bacteria responsible for severe neonatal infection. Comparative genomics can also be used to generate specificity for vaccines against pathogens that are closely related to commensal microorganisms. For example, researchers used comparative genomic analysis of commensal and pathogenic strains of E. coli to identify pathogen-specific genes as a basis for finding antigens that result in immune response against pathogenic strains but not commensal ones. In May 2019, using the Global Genome Set, a team in the UK and Australia sequenced thousands of globally collected isolates of Group A Streptococcus, providing potential targets for developing a vaccine against the pathogen, also known as S. pyogenes.

Personalized Medicine

Personalized Medicine, enabled by Comparative Genomics, represents a revolutionary approach in healthcare, tailoring medical treatment and disease prevention to the individual patient's genetic makeup. By analyzing genetic variations across populations and comparing them with an individual's genome, clinicians can identify specific genetic markers associated with disease susceptibility, drug metabolism, and treatment response. By identifying genetic variants associated with drug metabolism pathways, drug targets, and adverse reactions, personalized medicine can optimize medication selection, dosage, and treatment regimens for individual patients. This approach minimizes the risk of adverse drug reactions, enhances treatment efficacy, and improves patient outcomes.

Cancer

Cancer Genomics represents a field within oncology that leverages comparative genomics to revolutionize cancer diagnosis, treatment, and prevention strategies. Comparative genomics plays a crucial role in cancer research by identifying driver mutations, and providing comprehensive analyses of mutations, copy number alterations, structural variants, gene expression, and DNA methylation profiles in large-scale studies across different cancer types. By analyzing the genomes of cancer cells and comparing them with healthy cells, researchers can uncover key genetic alterations driving tumorigenesis, tumor progression, and metastasis. This deep understanding of the genomic landscape of cancer has profound implications for precision oncology. Moreover, Comparative Genomics is instrumental in elucidating mechanisms of drug resistance—a major challenge in cancer treatment.

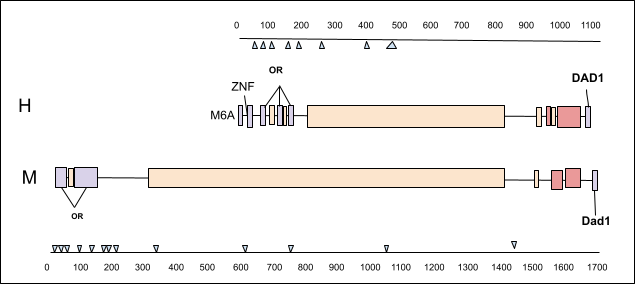
TCR loci from humans (H, top) and mice (M, bottom) are compared, with TCR elements in red, non-TCR genes in purple, and V segments in orange, other TCR elements in red. M6A, a putative methyltransferase; ZNF, a zinc-finger protein; OR, olfactory receptor genes; DAD1, defender against cell death; The sites of species-specific, processed pseudogenes are shown by gray triangles. See also GenBank accession numbers AE000658-62. Modified after Glusman et al. 2001.

==== Mouse models in immunology ====
T cells (also known as a T lymphocytes or a thymocytes) are immune cells that grow from stem cells in the bone marrow. They assist to defend the body from infection and may aid in the fight against cancer. Because of their morphological, physiological, and genetic resemblance to humans, mice and rats have long been the preferred species for biomedical research animal models. Comparative Medicine Research is built on the ability to use information from one species to understand the same processes in another. We can get new insights into molecular pathways by comparing human and mouse T cells and their effects on the immune system utilizing comparative genomics. In order to comprehend its TCRs and their genes, Glusman conducted research on the sequencing of the human and mouse T cell receptor loci. TCR genes are well-known and serve as a significant resource for supporting functional genomics and understanding how genes and intergenic regions of the genome contribute to biological processes.

T-cell immune receptors are important in seeing the world of pathogens in the cellular immune system. One of the reasons for sequencing the human and mouse TCR loci was to match the orthologous gene family sequences and discover conserved areas using comparative genomics. These, it was thought, would reflect two sorts of biological information: (1) exons and (2) regulatory sequences. In fact, the majority of V, D, J, and C exons could be identified in this method. The variable regions are encoded by multiple unique DNA elements that are rearranged and connected during T cell (TCR) differentiation: variable (V), diversity (D), and joining (J) elements for the and polypeptides; and V and J elements for the and polypeptides.[Figure 1] However, several short noncoding conserved blocks of the genome had been shown. Both human and mouse motifs are largely clustered in the 200 bp [Figure 2], the known 3′ enhancers in the TCR/ were identified, and a conserved region of 100 bp in the mouse J intron was subsequently shown to have a regulatory function.

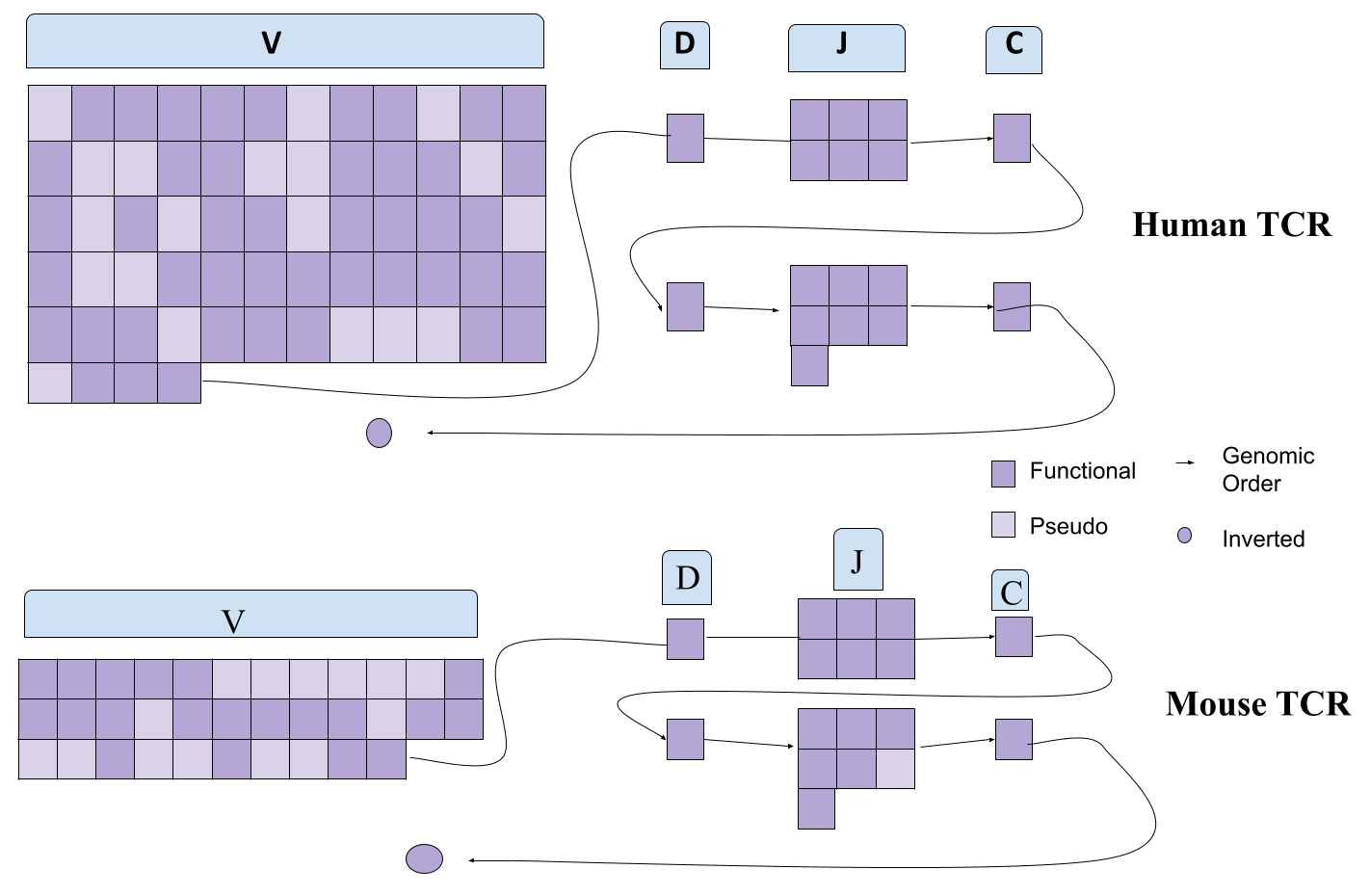
[Figure 2] Gene structure of the human (top) and mouse (bottom) V, D, J, and C gene segments. The arrows represent the transcriptional direction of each TCR gene. The squares and circles represent going in a direct and reverse direction. Modified after Glusman et al. 2001.

Comparisons of the genomic sequences within each physical site or location of a specific gene on a chromosome (locs) and across species allow for research on other mechanisms and other regulatory signals. Some suggest new hypotheses about the evolution of TCRs, to be tested (and improved) by comparison to the TCR gene complement of other vertebrate species. A comparative genomic investigation of humans and mice will obviously allow for the discovery and annotation of many other genes, as well as identifying in other species for regulatory sequences.

=== Research ===
Comparative genomics also opens up new avenues in other areas of research. As DNA sequencing technology has become more accessible, the number of sequenced genomes has grown. With the increasing reservoir of available genomic data, the potency of comparative genomic inference has grown as well.

A notable case of this increased potency is found in recent primate research. Comparative genomic methods have allowed researchers to gather information about genetic variation, differential gene expression, and evolutionary dynamics in primates that were indiscernible using previous data and methods.

Comparative genomics has also become increasingly important in microbial ecology and plant–microbe interaction research. By comparing large collections of bacterial genomes from different environments, researchers have been able to identify genes and functional pathways associated with adaptation to specific ecological niches, such as plant-associated versus free-living lifestyles. When combined with transcriptomic or metagenomic data, comparative genomic approaches can link gene conservation and abundance to ecological relevance, revealing bacterial genes that are consistently enriched and transcriptionally active in plant-associated environments. These studies have shown that bacterial adaptation to plants often involves numerous, previously uncharacterized genes rather than a small number of well-known determinants, highlighting the role of comparative genomics in uncovering hidden functional diversity and evolutionary specialization in microbial genomes.

==== Great Ape Genome Project ====
The Great Ape Genome Project used comparative genomic methods to investigate genetic variation with reference to the six great ape species, finding healthy levels of variation in their gene pool despite shrinking population size. Another study showed that patterns of DNA methylation, which are a known regulation mechanism for gene expression, differ in the prefrontal cortex of humans versus chimps, and implicated this difference in the evolutionary divergence of the two species.

== See also ==
- Data mining
- Molecular evolution
- Comparative anatomy
- Homology
- Sequence mining
- Alignment-free sequence analysis
