= G'MIC =

Free and open-source framework for image processing

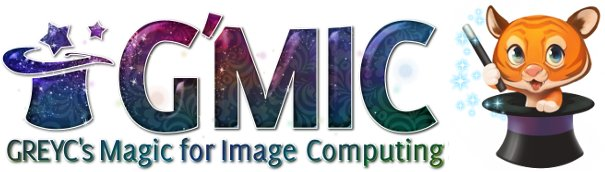
- Original author: GREYC Lab Groupe de recherche en informatique, image, automatique et instrumentation de Caen
- Developer: GREYC Lab
- Initial release: July 18, 2016; 9 years ago
- Stable release: 3.7.6 / 13 May 2026; 31 days ago
- Written in: C++
- Operating system: Cross-platform
- Type: Image manipulation
- License: CECILL-2.1 or CECILL-C
- Website: gmic.eu
- Repository: github.com/GreycLab/gmic

G'MIC (GREYC's Magic for Image Computing) is a free and open-source framework for image processing. It defines a script language that allows the creation of complex macros. Originally usable only through a command line interface, it is currently mostly popular as a GIMP plugin, and is also included in Krita. G'MIC is dual-licensed under CECILL-2.1 or CECILL-C.

== Features ==
G'MIC's graphical interface is notable for its noise removal filters, which came from an earlier project called GREYCstoration by the same authors. G'MIC offers many built-in commands for image processing, including basic mathematical manipulations, look up tables, and filtering operations. More complex macros and pipelines built out of those commands are defined in its library files.

== Interpreters ==
=== Command line ===
Combined screenshots into a video file. Smooth transitions between images are made with the command: gmic -w -fade_files

G'MIC is primarily a script language callable from a shell. For example, to display an image:

gmic image.jpg

This command displays the image contained in the file image.jpg and allows zooming in to examine values.

Several filters can be applied in succession. For example, to crop and resize an image:

gmic image.jpg -crop 0,0,250,250 -resize 50%,50%

=== Graphical interface ===
G'MIC comes with a Qt-based graphical interface, which may be integrated as a Gimp or Krita plugin. It contains several hundred filters written in the G'MIC language, dynamically updated through an internet feed. The interface provides a preview and setting sliders for each filter.

G'MIC is one of the most popular Gimp plugins.

=== G'MIC Online ===
Most of the filters available for the graphical interface are also available online.

=== ZArt ===
ZArt is a graphical interface for real-time manipulation of webcam images.

=== libgmic ===
Libgmic is a C++ library that can be linked to third-party applications. It sees integration in Flowblade and Veejay.
