= DECIPHER (software) =

- Developer(s): Erik Wright
- Stable release: 3.4.0 / 2025
- Written in: R, C
- Operating system: Unix, Linux, macOS, Windows
- Platform: x86-64, ARM
- Available in: English
- Type: Bioinformatics
- License: GPL 3
- Website: decipher.codes

DECIPHER is a software that can be used to decipher and manage biological sequences efficiently using the programming language R.

== Features ==
- Sequence databases: import, maintain, view, and export, and interact with a massive number of sequences.
- Homology finding: rapidly query sequences for homologous hits among a set of target sequences or genomes. Cluster into groups of related sequences.
- Multiple sequence alignment: align sequences of DNA, RNA, or amino acids.
- Genome alignment: find and align the syntenic regions of multiple genomes.
- Oligonucleotide design: primer design for polymerase chain reaction (PCR), probe design for fluorescence in situ hybridization (FISH) or DNA microarrays.
- Manipulate sequences: trim low quality regions, correct frameshifts, reorient nucleotides, determine consensus, or digest with restriction enzymes.
- Analyze sequences: find chimeras, detect repeats, predict secondary structure, classify into a taxonomy of organisms or functions, create phylogenetic trees, and ancestral reconstruction.
- Gene finding: predict coding and non-coding genes in a genome, extract them from the genome, and export them to a file.

== See also ==
- Sequence alignment software
