= PhoX =

Proof assistant program

In automated theorem proving, PhoX is a proof assistant based on higher-order logic which is eXtensible. The user gives PhoX an initial goal and guides it through subgoals and evidence to prove that goal; internally, it constructs natural deduction trees. Each previously proven formula can become a rule for later proofs.

PhoX was originally designed and implemented by Christophe Raffalli in the OCaml programming language. He has continued to lead the current development team, a joint effort of University of Savoy and University Paris VII.

The primary aim of the PhoX project creating a user friendly proof checker using the type system developed by Jean-Louis Krivine at University Paris VII. It is meant to be more intuitive than other systems while remaining extensible, efficient, and expressive. Compared to other systems, the proof-building syntax is simplified and closer to natural language. Other features include GUI-driven proof construction, rendering formatted output, and proof of correctness of programs in the ML programming language.

PhoX is currently used to teach logic at Savoy University. It is in an experimental but usable state. It is released under CeCILL 2.0.
