= Sim4 =

Sim4 is a nucleotide sequence alignment program akin to BLAST but specifically tailored to DNA to cDNA/EST (Expressed Sequence Tag) alignment (as opposed to DNA–DNA or protein–protein alignment). It was written by Florea et al.
