= VISTA (comparative genomics) =

VISTA Enhancer Browser

Content
- Description: a database of tissue-specific human enhancers.

Contact
- Primary citation: Visel & al. (2007)
- Release date: 2006

Access
- Website: https://enhancer.lbl.gov

VISTA is a collection of databases, tools, and servers that permit extensive comparative genomics analyses.

== Background ==
The VISTA family of tools is developed and hosted at the Genomics Division of Lawrence Berkeley National Laboratory. This collaborative effort is supported by the Programs for Genomic Applications grant from the NHLBI/NIH and the Office of Biological and Environmental Research, Office of Science, US Department of Energy.

It was developed from modules supplied by developers at UC Berkeley, Stanford, and UC Davis, and based partly on the AVID Global Alignment program.

== Usage ==
There are multiple VISTA servers, each allowing different types of searches.

- mVISTA can be used to align and compare your sequences to those of multiple other species
- rVISTA (regulatory VISTA) combines transcription factor binding sites database search with a comparative sequence analysis, the discovery of possible regulatory transcription factor binding sites in regions of their genes of interest. It can be used directly or through mVISTA, Genome VISTA, or VISTA Browser. A database of tissue-specific human enhancers is available through VISTA Enhancer Browser.
- GenomeVISTA allows the comparison of sequences with whole genome assemblies. It will automatically find the ortholog, obtain the alignment and VISTA plot. It allows the viewing of an alignment together with pre-computed alignments of other species in the same interval.
- Phylo-VISTA allows the analysis of multiple DNA sequence alignments of sequences from different species while considering their phylogenic relationships.
- wgVISTA allows the alignment of sequences up to 10Mb long (finished or draft) including microbial whole-genome assemblies.

Researchers can use the VISTA Browser:

- to examine pre-computed alignments among a variety of species
- to submit sequences of their own (not limited by the species collection already in the database)

== Genomes ==
There are more than 28 searchable genomes, including vertebrate, non-vertebrate, plants, fungi, algae, bacteria, and others. More are continually being added. These include:

- Human—orangutan—rhesus—marmoset—horse—dog—mouse—rat—chicken
- Drosophila spp.
- Arabidopsis—rice—sorghum
- E. coli—mycoplasma—nitrosomonas

== Collaboration with other projects ==
Pre-computed full scaffold alignments for microbial genomes are available as the VISTA component of IMG (Integrated Microbial Genomes System) developed in the DOE (Department of Energy's) Joint Genome Institute.
