= MAVID =

- Developer(s): Nicolas Bray (UC Berkeley), Lior Pachter (UC Berkeley)
- Stable release: 2.0.4
- Operating system: UNIX, Linux, Mac
- Type: Bioinformatics tool
- Licence: Open source
- Website: MAVID download

MAVID is a multiple sequence alignment program suitable for the alignment of large numbers of DNA sequences. The sequences can be small mitochondrial genomes or large genomic regions up to megabases long. The latest version is 2.0.4.

The program can be used through the MAVID web server or as a standalone program which can be installed with the source code.

== Input/Output ==
This program accepts sequences in FASTA format.

The output format includes: FASTA format, Clustal, PHYLIP.
