= CeCILL =

CEA CNRS INRIA Logiciel Libre
- Author: CEA, CNRS, & INRIA
- Latest version: 2.1
- Publisher: CEA, CNRS, & INRIA
- Published: 21 June 2013
- SPDX identifier: CECILL-2.1
- Debian FSG compatible: Yes
- FSF approved: Yes
- OSI approved: Yes (2.1 only)
- GPL compatible: Yes
- Copyleft: Yes
- Linking from code with a different license: No
- Website: cecill.info

CeCILL (from CEA CNRS INRIA Logiciel Libre) is a free software license adapted to both international and French legal matters, in the spirit of and retaining compatibility with the GNU General Public License (GPL).

It was jointly developed by a number of French agencies: the Commissariat à l'Énergie Atomique (Atomic Energy Commission), the Centre National de la recherche scientifique (National Centre for Scientific Research) and the Institut national de recherche en informatique et en automatique (National Institute for Research in Computer Science and Control). It was announced on 5 July 2004 in a joint press communication of the CEA, CNRS and INRIA.

It has gained support of the main French Linux User Group and the Minister for the Civil Service, and was considered for adoption at the European level before the European Union Public Licence was created.

== Terms ==
The CeCILL grants users the right to copy, modify, and distribute the licensed software freely. It defines the rights as passing from the copyright holder to a "Licensor", which may be the copyright holder or a further distributor, to the user or "Licensee". Like the GPL, it requires that modifications to the software be distributed under the CeCILL, but it makes no claim to work that executes in "separate address spaces", which may be licensed under terms of the licensee's choice. It does not grant a patent license (as some other common open-source licenses do), but rather includes a promise by the licensor not to enforce any patents it owns. In Article 9.4, the licensor agrees to provide "technical and legal assistance" if litigation regarding the software is brought against the licensee, though the extent of the assistance "shall be decided on a case-by-case basis...pursuant to a memorandum of understanding".

The disclaimers of warranty and liability are written in a manner different from other common open-source licenses to comply with French law. The CeCILL does not preclude the licensor from offering a warranty or technical support for its software, but requires that such services be negotiated in a separate agreement.

The license is compatible with the GPL through an explicit relicensing clause.

Article 13's explicit reference to French law and a French court does not limit users, who can still choose a jurisdiction of their choice by mutual agreement to solve any litigation they may experience. The explicit reference to a French court will be used only if mutual agreement is not possible; this immediately solves the problem of competence of laws (something that the GPL does not solve cleanly, except when all parties in litigation are in the USA).

== Versions ==
Version 2 was developed after consultations with the French-speaking Linux and Free Software Users' Association, the Association pour la Promotion et la Recherche en Informatique Libre, and the Free Software Foundation; it was released on 21 May 2005. According to the CeCILL FAQ there are no major differences in spirit, though there are in terms.

The most notable difference in CeCILL v2 is the fact that the English text was approved not as a draft translation (as in CeCILL v1) but as an authentic text, in addition to the equally authentic French version. This makes the CeCILL license much easier to enforce internationally, as the cost of producing an authentic translation in any international court will be lower with the help of a second authentic reference text. The second difference is that the reference to the GNU General Public License, with which CeCILL v2 is now fully compatible, is explicitly defined precisely using its exact title and the exact name of the Free Software Foundation, to avoid all possible variations of the terms of the GPL v2. Some additional definitions were added to more precisely define the terms with less ambiguity. With these changes, the CeCILL is now fully enforceable according to WIPO rules, and according to French law in courts, without the legal problems remaining in GPL version 2 outside the United States.

Version 2.1 was released in June 2013. It allows relicensing to the GNU Affero General Public License and the European Union Public License as well as the GPL, and clarifies the language that requires licensees to give access to the source code (which had previously caused rejection of version 2.0 by the Open Source Initiative).

== International protection and approbation of the CeCILL licenses ==
Note that CeCILL v1 already allowed replacing a CeCILL v1 license with CeCILL v2, so all software previously licensed with CeCILL v1 in 2004 can be licensed with CeCILL v2, with legal terms enforceable as authentic not only in French but in English too.

The fact that it is protected by reputed public research centers (in France the INRIA, a founding member of the international W3 consortium, and the CEA working on atomic energy) which use them to publish their own open-source and free software, and by critical governmental organizations (which are also working in domains like military and defense systems) also gives much more security than using the GPL alone, as the license is supported officially by a government which is a full member of WIPO, and by an enforceable law. This also means that all international treaties related to the protection of intellectual rights do apply to CeCILL-licensed products, and so they are enforceable by law in all countries that signed any of the international treaties protected by WIPO. However, this also leaves open the possibility that the French government will make a future version of the CeCILL unfree and restricted.

The CeCILL license is approved as a "Free Software" license by the FSF with which the CeCILL project founders have worked. Since version 2.1, CeCILL is also approved by the Open Source Initiative as an "Open Source" license.

== Other CeCILL licenses ==
The CeCILL project also adds two other licenses:

- CeCILL-B, which is fully compatible with BSD-like licenses (BSD, X11, MIT) which have a strong attribution requirement (which goes much further than a simple copyright notice), a requirement normally not allowed by the GPL itself (which describes it as an advertising requirement), and so this license may be incompatible with the original CeCILL license, if BSD-like components are integrated, unless the software uses a dual-licensing scheme and conforms to the licensing terms of all embedded components.
- CeCILL-C, for "component" software, which is fully compatible with the FSF's LGPL license.

These two licenses are also defined to make BSD-like and FSF's LGPL licenses enforceable internationally under WIPO rules.

== Notable users ==
- Brian (software)
- G'MIC
- MedinTux
- Paradiseo
- PhoX
- Scilab
- ScientificPython
- SYNTAX
- Yass (software)

== Origins and general applicability ==
Although the three CeCILL licenses were developed and used for strategic French research systems (in the domain of defense, space launching systems, medical research, meteorology/climatology, and various domains of fundamental or applied physics), they are made to be usable also by the general public or any other commercial or non-profit organization, including from other governments, simply because these software component need and use (or are integrated with) component software or systems which were initially released with an open-source or free license, and they are operated by organizations that also have a commercial status.

Without these licenses, such systems could not have been built and used, and protected legally against various international patent claims. Due to the huge cost of these French strategic systems, a very strong licensing scheme was absolutely necessary to help protecting these investments against illegitimate claims by other commercial third parties, and one of the first needs was to make the well-known open-source and free licenses fully compatible and protected under the French law and the many international treaties ratified by France.
