= JAligner =

JAligner is an open source Java implementation of the Smith-Waterman algorithm with Gotoh's improvement for biological local pairwise sequence alignment using the affine gap penalty model. It was written by Ahmed Moustafa.

== See also ==
- Sequence alignment software
- Clustal
