= Langmead =

Langmead is a surname. Notable people with the surname include:

- Richard Langmead (born 1972), former rugby union player
- Thomas Pitt Taswell-Langmead (1840–1882), English barrister and academic
- Kelvin Langmead (born 1985), English professional footballer
- Ben Langmead, a computational biologist at Johns Hopkins University
- Philip Langmead (c.1739 – 1816), member of Parliament for Plymouth
