= Steven Salzberg =

American biologist and computer scientist

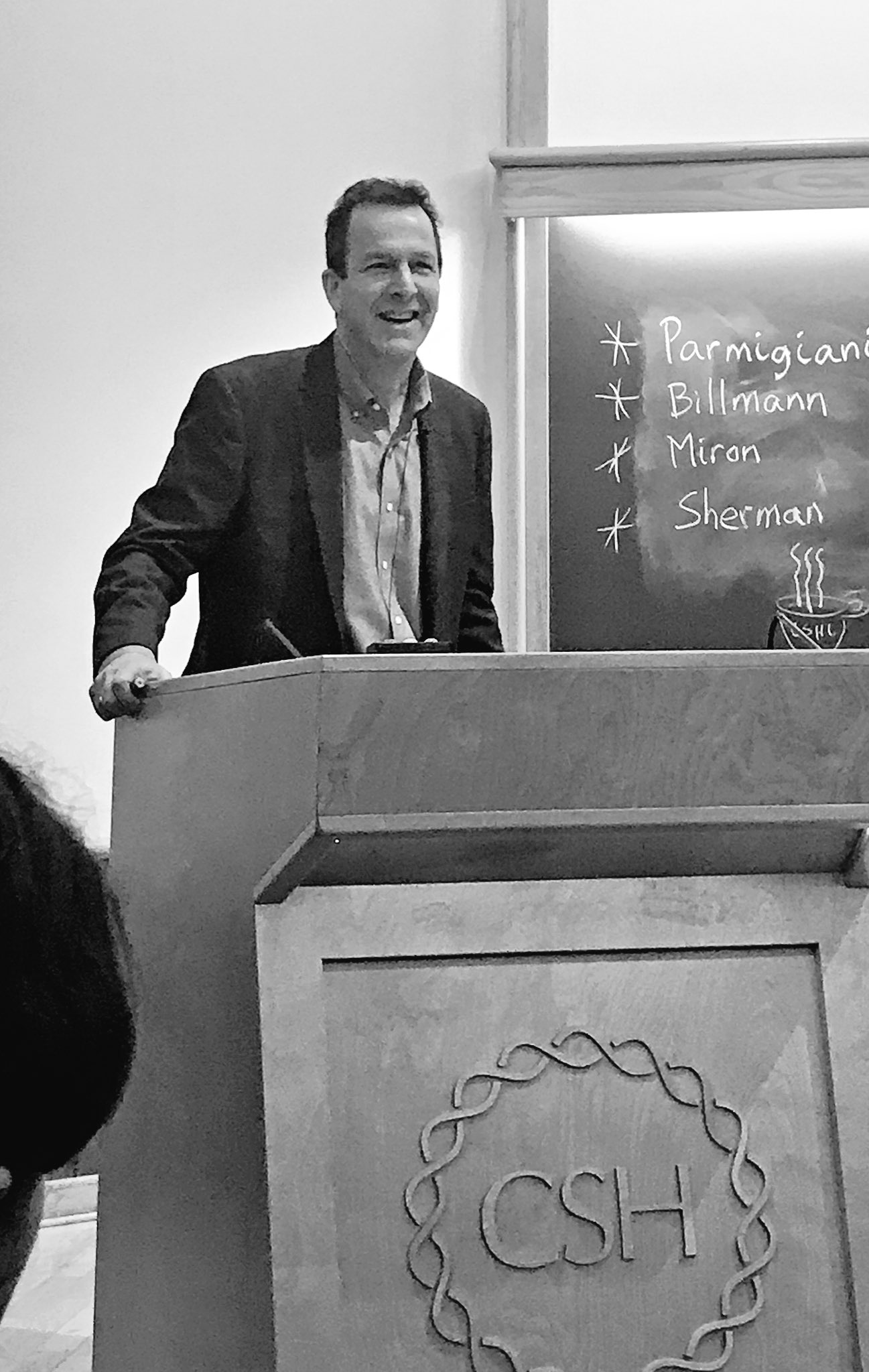
- Steven Salzberg at the Biological Data Science conference (CSHL) in 2018
- Born: Steven Lloyd Salzberg; 1960 (age 65–66)
- Education: Yale University; Harvard University
- Known for: GLIMMER; MUMmer; AMOS assembler Bowtie; TopHat
- Awards: Ben Franklin Award (2013)
- Scientific career
- Institutions: University of Maryland, College Park; The Institute for Genomic Research; Johns Hopkins University
- Thesis: Learning with nested generalized exemplars (1989)
- Doctoral advisor: William Aaron Woods
- Doctoral students: Cole Trapnell; Benjamin Langmead; Adam M. Phillippy; Michael Schatz
- Other notable students: Olga Troyanskaya
- Website: salzberg-lab.org

Steven Lloyd Salzberg (born 1960) is an American computational biologist and computer scientist who is a Bloomberg Distinguished Professor of Biomedical Engineering, Computer Science, and Biostatistics at Johns Hopkins University, where he is also Director of the Center for Computational Biology.

== Early life and education ==
Salzberg was born in 1960 as one of four children to Herman Salzberg, a Distinguished Professor Emeritus of Psychology, and Adele Salzberg, a retired school teacher. Salzberg did his undergraduate studies at Yale University where he received his Bachelor of Arts degree in English in 1980. In 1981 he returned to Yale, and he received his Master of Science and Master of Philosophy degrees in Computer Science in 1982 and 1984, respectively. After several years in a startup company, he enrolled at Harvard University, where he earned a Ph.D. in Computer Science in 1989.

== Career ==
After obtaining his undergraduate degree, he worked for a local power company in South Carolina, where he gained programming experience on an IBM mainframe, programming in COBOL and IBM assembly language. He then joined a Boston-based AI startup upon completion of his master's degree in computer science.

After earning his Ph.D., Salzberg joined Johns Hopkins University as an assistant professor in the Department of Computer Science, and was promoted to associate professor in 1997. From 1998 to 2005, he was the head of the Bioinformatics department at The Institute for Genomic Research, one of the world's largest genome sequencing centers. Salzberg then joined the Department of Computer Science at the University of Maryland, College Park, where he was the Horvitz Professor of Computer Science as well as the Director of the Center for Bioinformatics and Computational Biology. In 2011, Salzberg returned to Johns Hopkins University as a professor in the McKusick-Nathans Institute of Genetic Medicine and in the Department of Medicine.

In 2013, Salzberg won the Benjamin Franklin award in bioinformatics.

In 2014, he was named a Bloomberg Distinguished Professor at Johns Hopkins University for his accomplishments as an interdisciplinary researcher and excellence in teaching the next generation of scholars. The Bloomberg Distinguished Professorships were established in 2013 by a gift from Michael Bloomberg. Salzberg holds joint appointments in the Johns Hopkins Whiting School of Engineering, Johns Hopkins School of Medicine, and the Johns Hopkins Bloomberg School of Public Health.

== Research ==
Salzberg has been a prominent scientist in the field of bioinformatics and computational biology since the 1990s. He has made many contributions to gene finding algorithms, notably the GLIMMER program for bacterial gene finding as well as several related programs for finding genes in animals, plants, and other organisms. He has also been a leader in genome assembly research and has led the assembly of dozens of genomes, both large and small. He was a participant in the Human Genome Project as well as many other genome projects, including the malaria genome (Plasmodium falciparum) and the genome of the model plant Arabidopsis thaliana. In 2001–2002, he and his colleagues sequenced the anthrax that was used in the 2001 anthrax attacks. They published their results in the journal Science in 2002. These findings helped the FBI track the source of the attacks to a single vial at Ft. Detrick in Frederick, Maryland.

Salzberg together with David Lipman and Lone Simonsen started the Influenza Genome Sequencing Project in 2003, a project to sequence and make available the genomes of thousands of influenza virus isolates.

Soon after the advent of next-generation sequencing (NGS) in the mid-2000s, Salzberg's research lab and his collaborators developed a suite of highly efficient, accurate programs for alignment of NGS sequences to large genomes and for assembly of sequences from RNA-Seq experiments. These became known as the "Tuxedo" suite, including the Bowtie and TopHat programs, which have been cited tens of thousands of times in the years since their publication.

Salzberg has also been a vocal advocate against pseudoscience and has authored editorials and appeared in print media on this topic. From 2010-2024, he wrote a column at Forbes magazine on science, medicine, and pseudoscience, where he published over 300 articles that collectively received tens of millions of views. His work at Forbes won the 2012 Robert P. Balles Prize in Critical Thinking. Since 2025, his columns have appeared on Substack at https://stevensalzberg.substack.com/, which includes all of his Forbes columns and others, nearly 500 articles in all.

Salzberg was a charter member of the Cambridge Working Group in 2014, which was created to express alarm in the scientific community over the creation of highly transmissible and contagious viruses (also called Gain-of-function research) and the likelihood of an accidental lab release.

== Publications ==
Salzberg has authored or co-authored over 350 scientific publications. He has more than 400,000 citations in Google Scholar and an h-index of 170. In 2014 Salzberg was selected for inclusion in HighlyCited.com, a ranking compiled by the Institute for Scientific Information of scientists who are among the top 1% most cited for their subject field during the previous ten years. He was also chosen for this list when it was first created in 2001. This list of highly cited researchers continues under Clarivate, and Salzberg was included in the list every year since 2014, through at least 2025.

=== Highly cited articles (more than 10,000 citations) ===
- 2012 with B Langmead, Fast gapped-read alignment with Bowtie 2, in: Nature Methods. Vol. 9, nº 4; 357.
- 2009 With B Langmead, C Trapnell, M Pop, Ultrafast and memory-efficient alignment of short DNA sequences to the human genome, in: Genome Biology. Vol. 10, nº 3; 1–10.
- 2001 with JC Venter, MD Adams, EW Myers, PW Li, RJ Mural, et al., The sequence of the human genome, in: Science. Vol. 291, nº 5507; 1304–1351.
- 2015 with D Kim, B Langmead, HISAT: a fast spliced aligner with low memory requirements, in: Nature Methods Vol. 12, 357–360. (2015)
- 2010 with C Trapnell, BA Williams, G Pertea, A Mortazavi, G Kwan, MJ Van Baren, BJ Wold, L Pachter, Transcript assembly and quantification by RNA-Seq reveals unannotated transcripts and isoform switching during cell differentiation, in: Nature Biotechnology. Vol. 28, nº 5; 511–515.
- 2009 with C Trapnell, L Pachter, TopHat: discovering splice junctions with RNA-Seq, in: Bioinformatics. Vol. 25, nº 9; 1105–1111.
- 2013 with D Kim, G Pertea, C Trapnell, H Pimentel, R Kelley, TopHat2: accurate alignment of transcriptomes in the presence of insertions, deletions and gene fusions, in: Genome Biology. Vol. 14, nº 4; 1–13.
- 2012 with C Trapnell, A Roberts, L Goff, G Pertea, D Kim, DR Kelley, H Pimentel, JL Rinn, L Pachter. Differential gene and transcript expression analysis of RNA-seq experiments with TopHat and Cufflinks, in: Nature Protocols. Vol. 7, nº 3; 562-578.
- 2011 with T Magoč. FLASH: fast length adjustment of short reads to improve genome assemblies, in: Bioinformatics. Vol. 27, nº 21; 2957-2963.
- 2000 with The Arabidopsis Genome Initiative. Analysis of the genome sequence of the flowering plant Arabidopsis thaliana, in: Nature. Vol. 408, nº 6814; 796-815.

== Awards ==
- 2020 Accomplishments by a Senior Scientist Award, International Society for Computational Biology
- 2014-2024 Named Highly Cited Researcher, Thomson Reuters/Clarivate
- 2018 Elected member of the American Academy of Arts and Sciences
- 2020 Elected Fellow, Association for Computing Machinery (ACM)
- 2013 Elected Fellow, International Society for Computational Biology
- 2013 Robert G. Balles Prize in Critical Thinking
- 2013 Benjamin Franklin Award (Bioinformatics) for Open Access in the Life Sciences
- 2007 Hot 100 Authors, BioMed Central
- 2004 Fellow, American Association for the Advancement of Science
- 1996 NIH Career Award
