= Influenza Genome Sequencing Project =

Early 21st Century Project for Investigation of Influenza Evolution

The Influenza Genome Sequencing Project (IGSP), initiated in early 2004, seeks to investigate influenza evolution by providing a public data set of complete influenza genome sequences from collections of isolates representing diverse species distributions.

The project is funded by the National Institute of Allergy and Infectious Diseases (NIAID), a division of the National Institutes of Health (NIH), and has been operating out of the NIAID Microbial Sequencing Center at The Institute for Genomic Research (TIGR, which in 2006 became The Venter Institute). Sequence information generated by the project has been continually placed into the public domain through GenBank.

== Origins ==
In late 2003, David Lipman, Lone Simonsen, Steven Salzberg, and a consortium of other scientists wrote a proposal to begin sequencing large numbers of influenza viruses at The Institute for Genomic Research (TIGR). Prior to this project, only a handful of flu genomes were publicly available. Their proposal was approved by the National Institutes of Health (NIH), and would later become the IGSP. New technology development led by Elodie Ghedin began at TIGR later that year, and the first publication describing > 100 influenza genomes appeared in 2005 in the journal Nature

== Research goals ==
The project makes all sequence data publicly available through GenBank, an international, NIH-funded, searchable online database. This research helps to provide international researchers with the information needed to develop new vaccines, therapies and diagnostics, as well as improve understanding of the overall molecular evolution of Influenza and other genetic factors that determine their virulence. Such knowledge could not only help mitigate the impact of annual influenza epidemics, but could also improve scientific knowledge of the emergence of pandemic influenza viruses.

== Results ==
The project completed its first genomes in March 2005 and has rapidly accelerated since. By mid-2008, over 3000 isolates had been completely sequenced from influenza viruses that are endemic in human ("human flu") avian ("bird flu") and swine ("swine flu") populations, including many strains of H3N2 (human), H1N1 (human), and H5N1 (avian).

== Affiliations ==
The project is funded by the National Institute of Allergy and Infectious Diseases (NIAID) which is a component of the NIH, which is an agency of the United States Department of Health and Human Services.

The IGSP has expanded to include a growing list of collaborators, who have contributed both expertise and valuable collections of influenza isolates. Key early contributors included Peter Palese of the Mount Sinai School of Medicine in New York, Jill Taylor of the Wadsworth Center at the New York State Department of Health, Lance Jennings of Canterbury Health Laboratories (New Zealand), Jeff Taubenberger of the Armed Forces Institute of Pathology (who later moved to NIH), Richard Slemons of Ohio State University and Rob Webster of St. Jude's Children's Hospital in Memphis, Tennessee.

In 2006 the project was joined by Ilaria Capua of the Istituto Zooprofilattico Sperimentale delle Venezie (in Italy), who contributed a valuable collection of avian flu isolates (including multiple H5N1 strains). Some of these avian isolates were described in a publication in Emerging Infectious Diseases in 2007. Nancy Cox from the Centers for Disease Control and Prevention (CDC) and Robert Couch from Baylor College of Medicine also joined the project in 2006, contributing over 150 influenza B isolates.

The project began prospective studies of the 2007 influenza season with collaborators Florence Bourgeois and Kenneth Mandl of Children's Hospital Boston and the Harvard School of Public Health and Laurel Edelman of Surveillance Data Inc.
