= Ben Langmead =

American computational biologist

- Born: Benjamin Thomas Langmead
- Education: Columbia College, Columbia University; University of Maryland
- Known for: Bowtie sequence aligner
- Awards: Benjamin Franklin Award (2016)
- Scientific career
- Fields: Computational biology
- Workplaces: Johns Hopkins University
- Thesis: Algorithms and High Performance Computing Approaches for Sequencing-Based Comparative Genomics (2012)
- Doctoral advisor: Steven Salzberg
- Website: www.cs.jhu.edu/faculty/ben-langmead/

Ben Langmead is a computational biologist and associate professor in the Computational Biology & Medicine Group at Johns Hopkins University.

== Education ==
Langmead gained his Bachelor of Arts degree in computer science from Columbia College, Columbia University in 2003. He gained both his Master of Science and PhD degrees in computer science from the University of Maryland, supervised by Steven Salzberg, in 2009 and 2012, respectively.

== Career ==
Langmead is known for developing the Bowtie sequence alignment algorithm, which implements the Burrows–Wheeler transform in order to improve the scalability of sequence alignment. As of 2022, the original Genome Biology paper which describes the Bowtie software package has been cited over 20,000 times.

Langmead became an assistant professor at Johns Hopkins University in July 2012.

== Awards ==
Langmead was awarded the Benjamin Franklin Award in 2016 for his promotion of free and open access materials for use in life sciences.
