= TopHat (bioinformatics) =

TopHat is an open-source bioinformatics tool for the throughput alignment of shotgun cDNA sequencing reads generated by transcriptomics technologies (e.g. RNA-Seq) using Bowtie first and then mapping to a reference genome to discover RNA splice sites de novo. TopHat aligns RNA-Seq reads to mammalian-sized genomes.

== History ==
TopHat was originally developed in 2009 by Cole Trapnell, Lior Pachter and Steven Salzberg at the Center for Bioinformatics and Computational Biology at the University of Maryland, College Park and at the Mathematics Department, UC Berkeley. TopHat2 was a collaborative effort of Daehwan Kim and Steven Salzberg, initially at the University of Maryland, College Park and later at the Center for Computational Biology at Johns Hopkins University. Kim re-wrote some of Trapnell's original TopHat code in C++ to make it much faster, and added many heuristics to improve its accuracy, in a collaboration with Cole Trapnell and others. Kim and Salzberg also developed TopHat-fusion which used transcriptome data to discover gene fusions in cancer tissues.

== Uses ==
TopHat is used to align reads from an RNA-Seq experiment. It is a read-mapping algorithm and it aligns the reads to a reference genome. It is useful because it does not need to rely on known splice sites. TopHat can be used with the Tuxedo pipeline, and is frequently used with Bowtie.

== See also ==
- List of RNA-Seq bioinformatics tools
- Microarray analysis techniques
- Massive parallel sequencing
- RNA-Seq
