= Lior Pachter =

Computational biologist

- ליאור פאכטר
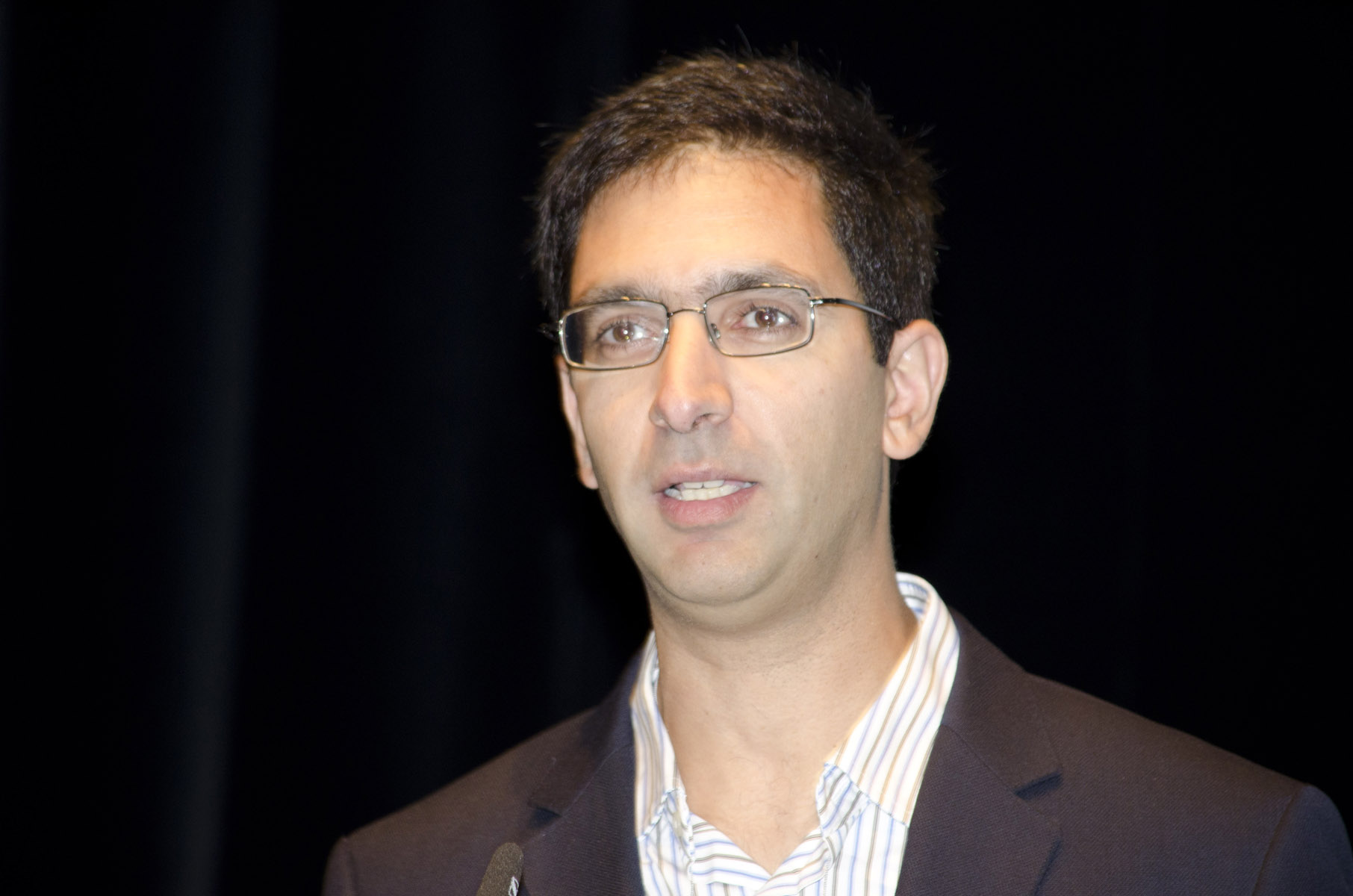
- Lior Pachter in 2013
- Born: Lior Samuel Pachter; May 3, 1973 (age 53); Ramat Gan, Israel
- Education: California Institute of Technology (BS); Massachusetts Institute of Technology (PhD)
- Awards: ISCB Fellow (2017)
- Scientific career
- Fields: Computational biology Bioinformatics; Genomics; Computer science Mathematics
- Workplaces: University of California, Berkeley
- Thesis: Domino Tiling, Gene Recognition and Mice (1999)
- Doctoral advisor: Bonnie Berger
- Doctoral students: Cole Trapnell
- Website: liorpachter.wordpress.com

Lior Samuel Pachter (Hebrew: ליאור שמואל פאכטר) is a computational biologist. He works at the California Institute of Technology, where he is the Bren Professor of Computational Biology. He has widely varied research interests including genomics, combinatorics, computational geometry, machine learning, scientific computing, and statistics.

== Early life and education ==
Pachter was born in Israel and grew up in South Africa. He earned a bachelor's degree in mathematics from the California Institute of Technology in 1994. He completed his doctorate in mathematics from the Massachusetts Institute of Technology in 1999, supervised by Bonnie Berger, with Eric Lander and Daniel Kleitman as co-advisors.

== Career and research ==
Pachter was with the University of California, Berkeley faculty from 1999 to 2018 and was awarded the Raymond and Beverly Sackler Chair in Computational Biology in 2012.

As well as for his technical contributions, Pachter is known for using new media to promote open science and for a thought experiment he posted on his blog according to which 'the nearest neighbor to the "perfect human"' is from Puerto Rico. This received considerable media attention, and a response was published in Scientific American. He is also known for criticisms of the All-of-us project's use of UMAP to visualize and interpret population genetics data.

=== Awards and honors ===
In 2017, Pachter was elected a Fellow of the International Society for Computational Biology (ISCB).

== See also ==
- TopHat (bioinformatics)
- Fast statistical alignment
