= Cole Trapnell =

Professor in the Department of Genome Sciences at the University of Washington

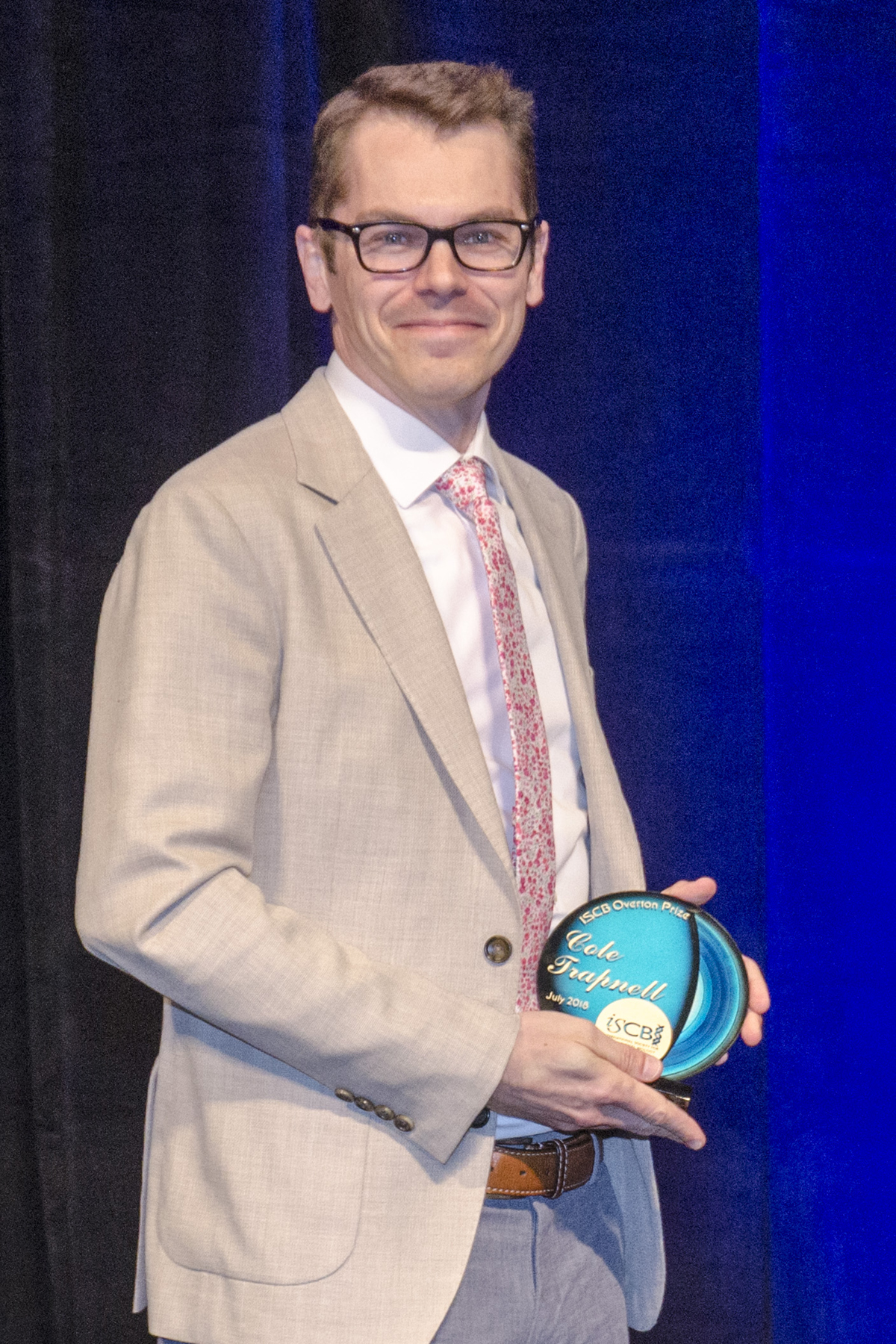
- Cole Trapnell at the Intelligent Systems for Molecular Biology (ISMB) conference in 2018
- Born: Bruce Colston Trapnell Jr. 1982 (age 43–44)
- Education: University of Maryland, College Park (BS, PhD)
- Known for: Bowtie; TopHat
- Awards: Overton Prize (2018)
- Scientific career
- Fields: Transcriptomics; Cell differentiation Non-coding RNA
- Workplaces: University of Washington; Harvard University
- Thesis: Transcript assembly and abundance estimation with high-throughput RNA sequencing (2010)
- Doctoral advisor: Steven Salzberg; Lior Pachter
- Website: www.gs.washington.edu/faculty/trapnell.htm

Bruce Colston Trapnell Jr. (born 1982) is a professor in the Department of Genome Sciences at the University of Washington. He is known for developing influential open-source software tools for transcriptomics, particularly for RNA-Seq and single-cell RNA-Seq data analysis. His work has been central to the fields of gene expression analysis and cellular differentiation. He was awarded the Overton Prize by the International Society for Computational Biology (ISCB) for "outstanding accomplishment in the early to mid stage of his career" in 2018.

== Education and career ==
Trapnell received dual B.S. degrees in Computer Science and Mathematics from the University of Maryland, College Park in 2005. He continued at Maryland for his doctoral studies, earning a Ph.D. in Computer Science in 2010. During his graduate work, he was jointly advised by Steven Salzberg at the University of Maryland and Lior Pachter at the University of California, Berkeley.

Following his Ph.D., Trapnell was a postdoctoral fellow in John Rinn's lab at Harvard University in the Department of Stem Cell and Regenerative Biology. During this time, he augmented his computational work with experimental biology training. In 2014, he joined the faculty at the University of Washington's Department of Genome Sciences. He is also a scientific co-director of the Seattle Hub for Synthetic Biology and an investigator at the Allen Discovery Center for Cell Lineage Tracing.

== Research and contributions ==
Trapnell's research focuses on developing computational and genomic technologies to study how cells make fate decisions during development and disease. His lab combines experimental and computational approaches to dissect gene regulatory networks.

=== RNA-Seq analysis tools ===
During his graduate studies, Trapnell developed several foundational tools for analyzing RNA-Seq data. He was the principal author of TopHat, a program for aligning RNA-Seq reads to a genome to identify splice junctions, and Cufflinks, which assembles and quantifies gene and transcript abundances from aligned reads.

As a postdoctoral fellow and later in his own lab, Trapnell pioneered the concept of pseudotemporal ordering, or "pseudotime," a method for ordering single cells along a developmental trajectory based on their gene expression profiles. This approach allows researchers to study dynamic biological processes, like cell differentiation, from a static snapshot of single-cell data. His lab developed the software package Monocle to implement these trajectory inference analyses.
