= BFAST =

Universal DNA sequence aligner tool

BFAST is a universal DNA sequence aligner tool developed at UCLA by Nils Homer.

The BFAST Web Server can be used to align short reads to reference sequences in both nucleotide space as well as ABI SOLiD color space.

Utilities include BFAST alignment, conversion between nucleotide and color space, calculating the a priori power of the alignments, as well as a utility to perform Smith Waterman alignment.

== Characteristics ==
BFAST has explicit time and accuracy tradeoff with a prior accuracy estimation, supported by indexing the reference sequences. The tool can handle short reads, DNA insertions, deletions, SNPs, and color errors (ABI SOLiD color space reads).

== See also ==
- POSIX
- GPL
