= Lone Simonsen =

Danish epidemiologist (born 1959)

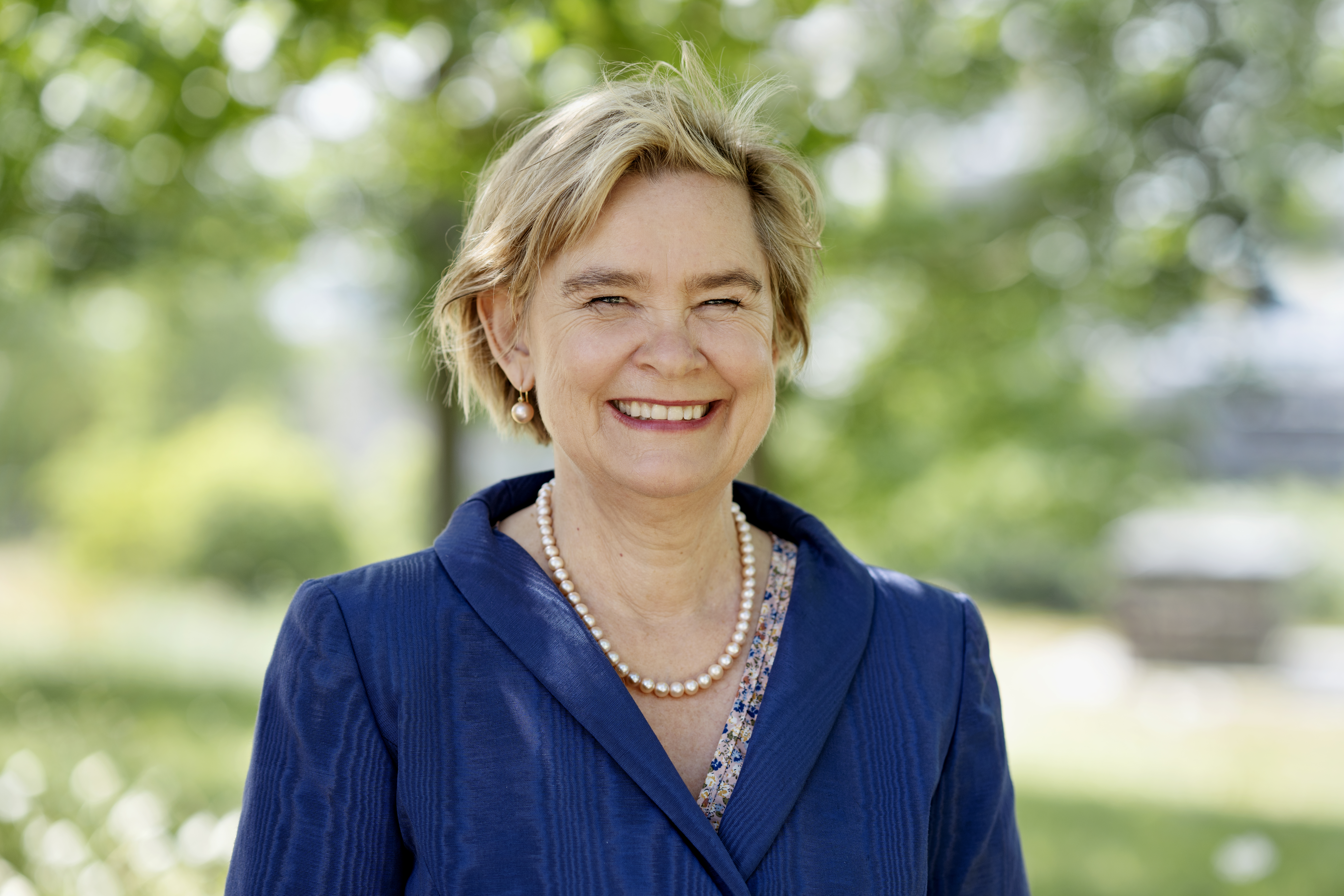
- Born: 1959 (age 66–67)
- Other names: Corona-Lone
- Education: Technical University of Denmark; University of Massachusetts Amherst; Roskilde University; Centers for Disease Control and Prevention (CDC)
- Occupations: Epidemiologist, scientist
- Employers: WHO (1997-1999); Centers for Disease Control and Prevention (1992-1996); National Institutes of Health (2000-2015); George Washington University (2007-present); University of Copenhagen (2015-2017); Roskilde University (2018-present)
- Awards: Danish Research Communication Award, Roskilde University Research Communication Award
- Website: forskning.ruc.dk/da/persons/lonesimo

Lone Simonsen (born 1959) is a Danish epidemiologist and professor of population health sciences. Since the beginning of 2020, she has been the director of PandemiX, an interdisciplinary pandemic research center at Roskilde University. In 2023 PandemiX was established as a Center of Excellence funded by the Danish National Research Foundation.

After receiving her graduate degree in biology and chemistry from Roskilde University in 1985, Simonsen continued her educational career at University of Massachusetts Amherst and in 1992 she received her PhD degree in population genetics. After receiving her degree at UMass, Simonsen conducted research in microbial ecology as a postdoctoral fellow at Danish Technical University. In 1992, she started working as an epidemiologist at Centers for Disease Control and Prevention, where in 1994, she received her graduate diploma in applied epidemiology.

Simonsen continued her career as an epidemiologist working for WHO, UNAIDS and later at NIH, where she conducted research in influenza pandemics. During her career, Simonsen has worked with issues including HIV/AIDS, tuberculosis, antibiotic resistance, SARS, pandemic influenza, e-health, surveillance systems and vaccine program evaluation. She was assigned by the NIH to WHO in Geneva to work on the SARS outbreak in 2003. She uses historical and current disease data together with mathematical models to predict the development of current and future epidemics. Trained in population genetics and epidemiology in the US, Simonsen returned to her native Denmark in 2014, working first at University of Copenhagen and later at University of Roskilde.

== COVID-19 ==
During the COVID-19 pandemic, Simonsen has been a central scientist advising the Danish health authorities and the government on the evolving situation, as well as conducted groundbreaking research on superspreading. She was often used as an epidemiological expert by Danish media and her large exposure gave her the nickname "Corona-Lone".

== Publications ==
Her primary research field is epidemiology and pandemics. Her main work are within these fields, but her publications cover a broad spectrum of themes within historical epidemiology, burden of disease modelling, global health epidemiology, vaccine program evaluation together with interdisciplinary research.

== Literary production (selected) ==
- Relationship dynamics and behavioral adaptations in the control of the 2022 mpox epidemic (2025),
- A disease suppression strategy in action: The impact of non-pharmaceutical interventions in the COVID-19 pandemic in Denmark (2025),
- Disentangling the relationship between cancer mortality and COVID-19 in the US (2024),
- Identifying signature features of epidemic diseases from 19th century all-cause mortality data (2024),
- Overdispersion in COVID-19 increases the effectiveness of limiting nonrepetitive contacts for transmission control (2021),
- Overdispersion in COVID-19 increases the effectiveness of limiting nonrepetitive contacts for transmission control (2021),
- Comparing SARS-CoV-2 with SARS-CoV and influenza pandemics (2020),
- Cholera Epidemics of the Past Offer New Insights Into an Old Enemy (2018),
- Global Mortality Estimates for the 2009 Influenza Pandemic: A Modeling Study (2013),
- Demographic variability, vaccination, and the spatiotemporal dynamics of rotavirus epidemics (2009),
- The signature features of influenza pandemics-implications for policy (2009),
- Epidemiologic characterization of the summer wave of the 1918 influenza pandemic in Copenhagen: Implications for pandemic control (2008),
- Mortality benefits of influenza vaccination in elderly people: an ongoing controversy (2007),
- The genesis and spread of reassortment human influenza A/H3N2 viruses conferring adamantane resistance (2007),
- Pandemic versus epidemic influenza mortality: A pattern of changing age distribution (1998),

== Honors and awards (selected) ==
- Knight of Order of the Dannebrog, 2023
- The Fritz Kaufmann Prize, Fritz Kaufmann Memorial Fund, 2023
- Danish Research Communication Award, Danish Ministry of Higher Education and Science, 2021.
- Roskilde University Research Communication Award, co-awarded with V. Andreasen, 2021
