= Richard Langmead =

Welsh rugby union player and coach

Richard Langmead, born 31 December 1972 in Llantrisant, Rhondda Cynon Taf, Wales, is a former rugby union player. An outside half, he played his club rugby for Treorchy RFC, Merthyr RFC, Llantrisant RFC and Pontypridd RFC.

He retired as a player in 2007 and began coaching at Old Illtydians RFC. In 2008, he became Team Manager at Pontypridd RFC.

Langmead is a manager at carpentry firm, GE Carpentry Ltd.
