= Fluorescent in situ sequencing =

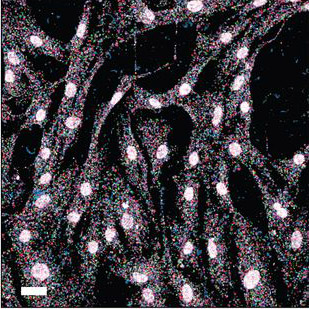
FISSEQ in fibroblast cells. Each spot is an RNA molecule reverse transcribed and amplified. The spot color indicates the base. The image represents one cycle in a sequencing run. 30 cycles would yield 30 bases of the RNA sequence. Scale bar 20um.

Fluorescent in situ sequencing (FISSEQ) is a method of sequencing a cell's RNA while it remains in tissue or culture using next-generation sequencing.

== Introduction ==
FISSEQ combines the spatial context of RNA-FISH and the global transcriptome profiling of RNA-seq. FISSEQ preserves the tissue allowing single molecule in situ RNA localization. The foundation of the method is a novel nucleic acid sequencing library construction method that stably cross-links cDNA amplicons within biological samples. Sequencing data is then generated through an intensive interleaved microscopy and biochemistry protocol and subsequent image processing and bioinformatics. FISSEQ is compatible with diverse sample types including cell culture, tissue sections, and whole mount embryos. FISSEQ is an example of an extremely dense form of in-situ nucleic acid readout: every letter along the RNA chain is read. Thus, barcodes for FISSEQ can be packed into a short string of DNA, as short as 15-20 nucleotides long for the mouse brain or 5 nucleotides for targeted cancer gene panels.

== Methods ==
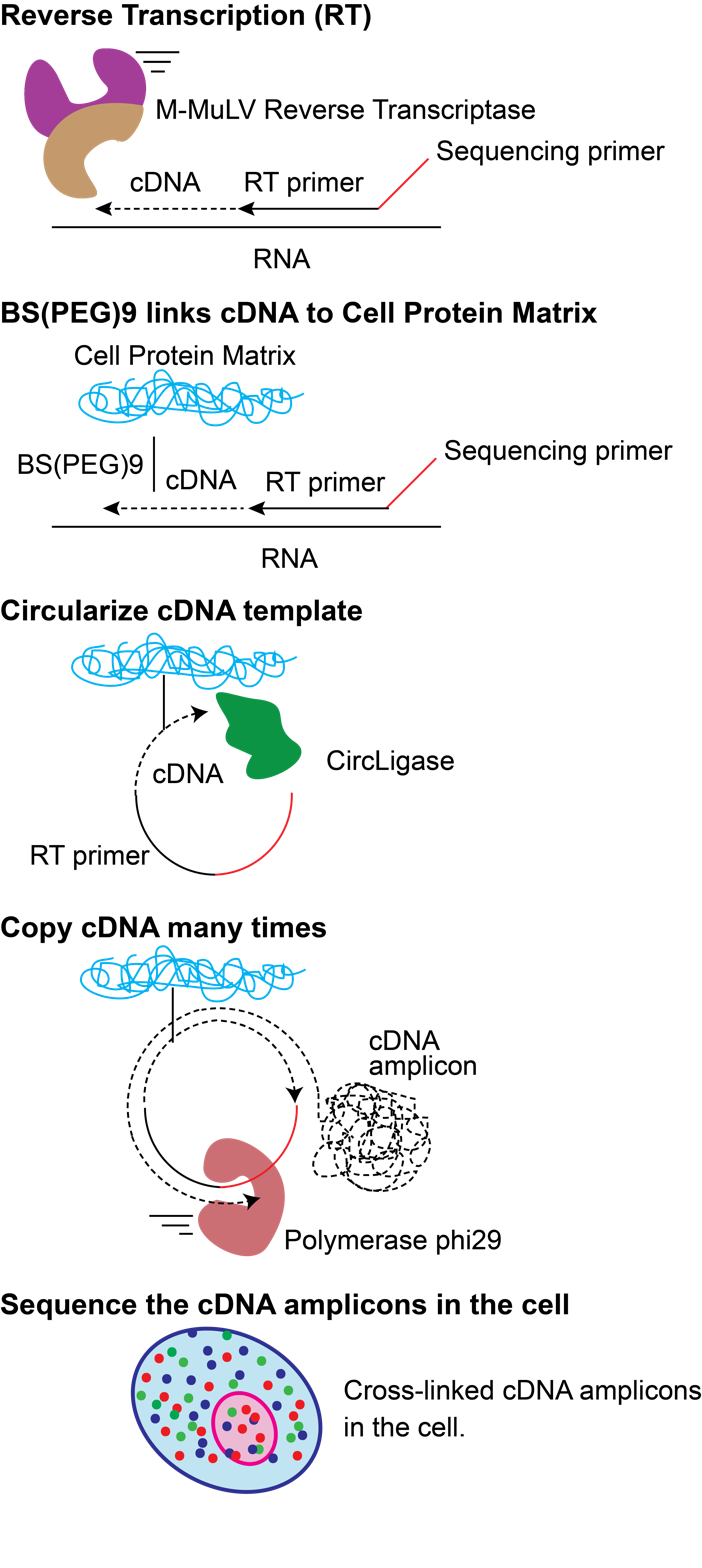
FISSEQ Schematic: A tagged random hexamer primer is used to prime M-MuLV reverse transcriptase to generate aminoallyl dUTP- modified cDNA fragments in fixed cells or tissues from RNA. BS(PEG)9 permanently cross-links the modified cDNA and the cellular protein matrix. After cDNA circularization, Phi29 DNA polymerase generates cDNA amplicons. Amplicons in 3D in situ RNA sequenced within the cell.

In FISSEQ, a series of biochemical processing steps, such as DNA ligations or single-base DNA polymerase extensions, are performed on a block of fixed tissue, interlaced with fluorescent imaging steps. The process is conceptually identical to the mechanism of fluorescent sequencing by synthesis in a commercial bulk DNA sequencing machine, except that it is performed in fixed tissue. Each DNA or RNA molecule in the sample is first “amplified” (i.e., copied) in-situ via rolling-circle amplification to create a localized “rolling circle colony” (rolony) consisting of identical copies of the parent molecule. A series of biochemical steps are then carried out. In the kth cycle, a fluorescent tag is introduced, the color of which corresponds to the identity of the kth base along the rolony’s parent DNA strand. The system is then “paused” in this state for imaging. The entire sample can be imaged in each cycle. The fluorescent tags are then cleaved and washed away, and the next cycle is initiated. Each rolony – corresponding to a single “parent” DNA or RNA molecule in the tissue – thus appears across a series of fluorescent images, as a localized “spot” with a sequence of colors corresponding to the nucleotide sequence of the parent molecule. The nucleotide sequence of each DNA or RNA molecule is thus read out in-situ via fluorescent microscopy.

== History ==
The development of FISSEQ began over a decade ago. The underlying principles are similar to those that ushered in the sequencing revolution. In both bulk high-throughput sequencing and FISSEQ, short sequences are locally amplified and then imaged one nucleotide at a time. However, the requirement to sequence RNA in intact tissue—rather than isolated and purified DNA, as in conventional bulk sequencing—posed additional challenges. These limitations were overcome, and FISSEQ allows the joint, high-throughput readout of sequence and spatial information.

== See also ==
- Nucleoside triphosphate
- Polony sequencing
