= Genome Biology =

- Discipline: Genomics
- Language: English
- Edited by: Veronique van den Berghe

Publication details
- History: 2000–present
- Publisher: BioMed Central
- Frequency: Continuous
- Open access: Yes
- License: CC BY 4.0
- Impact factor: 9.2 (2025)

Standard abbreviations
- ISO 4: Genome Biol.

Indexing
- CODEN: GNBLFW
- ISSN: 1474-760X (print); 1465-6906 (web)
- LCCN: 2002262017
- OCLC no.: 1076659408

Links
- Journal homepage; Online archive

Genome Biology is a peer-reviewed open access scientific journal covering research in genomics. It was established in 2000 and is published by BioMed Central. From 2022, the chief editor has been Veronique van den Berghe.

== Abstracting and indexing ==
The journal is abstracted and indexed in:

- Biological Abstracts
- BIOSIS Previews
- CAB Abstracts
- Current Contents/Life Sciences
- Embase
- EMBiology
- Index Medicus/MEDLINE/PubMed
- Science Citation Index
- Scopus
- The Zoological Record

According to the Journal Citation Reports, the journal has a 2025 impact factor of 9.2.
