= De novo sequence assemblers =

Software in bioinformatics

De novo sequence assemblers are a type of program that assembles short nucleotide sequences into longer ones without the use of a reference genome. These are most commonly used in bioinformatic studies to assemble genomes or transcriptomes. Two common types of de novo assemblers are greedy algorithm assemblers and De Bruijn graph assemblers.

== Types of de novo assemblers ==
There are two types of algorithms that are commonly utilized by these assemblers: greedy, which aim for local optima, and graph method algorithms, which aim for global optima. Different assemblers are tailored for particular needs, such as the assembly of (small) bacterial genomes, (large) eukaryotic genomes, or transcriptomes.

Greedy algorithm assemblers are assemblers that find local optima in alignments of smaller reads. Greedy algorithm assemblers typically feature several steps: 1) pairwise distance calculation of reads, 2) clustering of reads with greatest overlap, 3) assembly of overlapping reads into larger contigs, and 4) repeat. These algorithms typically do not work well for larger read sets, as they do not easily reach a global optimum in the assembly, and do not perform well on read sets that contain repeat regions. Early de novo sequence assemblers, such as SEQAID (1984) and CAP (1992), used greedy algorithms, such as overlap-layout-consensus (OLC) algorithms. These algorithms find overlap between all reads, use the overlap to determine a layout (or tiling) of the reads, and then produce a consensus sequence. Some programs that used OLC algorithms featured filtration (to remove read pairs that will not overlap) and heuristic methods to increase speed of the analyses.

Graph method assemblers come in two varieties: string and De Bruijn. String graph and De Bruijn graph method assemblers were introduced at a DIMACS workshop in 1994 by Waterman and Gene Myers. These methods represented an important step forward in sequence assembly, as they both use algorithms to reach a global optimum instead of a local optimum. While both of these methods made progress towards better assemblies, the De Bruijn graph method has become the most popular in the age of next-generation sequencing. During the assembly of the De Bruijn graph, reads are broken into smaller fragments of a specified size, k. The k-mers are then used as edges in the graph assembly. Nodes are built as (k-1)-mers connect by an edge. The assembler will then construct sequences based on the De Bruijn graph. De Bruijn graph assemblers typically perform better on larger read sets than greedy algorithm assemblers (especially when they contain repeat regions).

== Commonly used programs ==
List of de-novo assemblers
Name	Description / Methodology	Technologies	Author	Presented / Last updated	Licence*	Homepage
ABySS	parallel, paired-end sequence assembler designed for large genome assembly of short reads (genomic and transcriptomic), employ a Bloom filter to De Bruijn graph	Illumina		2009 / 2017	OS	link
Canu	Small and large, haploid/diploid genomes	PacBio/Oxford Nanopore reads		2001 / 2018	OS	link
CodonCode Aligner	Assemble fragments using local, end-to-end, or large gap (cDNA to genomic) algorithms. Supports sequence qualities. Run Phred and Phrap directly.	Sanger, Illumina, 454, Solexa	CodonCode Corporation	2003 / 2025	C	link
DISCOVAR	paired-end PCR-free reads (successor of ALLPATHS-LG)	Illumina (MiSeq or HiSeq 2500)		2014	OS	link
DNA Baser Sequence Assembler	DNA sequence assembly with automatic end trimming & ambiguity correction. Includes a base caller.	Sanger, Illumina	Heracle BioSoft SRL	2018.09	C ($69)	NA
DNASTAR Lasergene Genomics	Large genomes, exomes, transcriptomes, metagenomes, ESTs. Also de novo assembly and polishing of long read sequencing data from Oxford Nanopore and PacBio, including PacBio Hifi reads.	Illumina, ABI SOLiD, Roche 454, Ion Torrent, Solexa, Sanger	DNASTAR	2007 / 2023	C	link
Falcon	Diploid genomes	PacBio reads		2014 / 2017	OS	link
Flye	genomes and metagenomes. Makes use of repeat graphs	PacBio/Oxford Nanopore reads		2018/2023	OS	link
HGAP	Genomes up to 130 MB	PacBio reads		2011 / 2015	OS	link
hifiasm	Graph assembly	PacBio HiFi reads		2021	OS	link
Hinge	Small microbial genomes	PacBio/Oxford Nanopore reads		2016 / 2018	OS	link
MaSuRCA	Any size, haploid/diploid genomes	Illumina and PacBio/Oxford Nanopore data, legacy 454 and Sanger data		2011 / 2018	OS	link
Newbler	genomes, ESTs	454, Sanger	454 Life Sciences	2004/2012	C	link
Phrap	genomes	Sanger, 454, Solexa	Green, P.	1994 / 2008	C / NC-A	link
Plass	Protein-level assembler: assembles six-frame-translated sequencing reads into protein sequences	Illumina		2018 / 2019	OS	link
Ray	a suite of assemblers including de novo, metagenomic, ontology and taxonomic profiling; uses a De Bruijn graph			2010	OS	link
SPAdes	(small) genomes, single-cell	Illumina, Solexa, Sanger, 454, Ion Torrent, PacBio, Oxford Nanopore		2012 / 2021	OS	link
Trinity	transcriptome assemblies by de Bruijn graph	Illumina RNA-seq		2011		link
Velvet	(small) genomes	Sanger, 454, Solexa, SOLiD		2007 / 2011	OS	link
SOAPdenovo2	An empirically improved memory-efficient short-read de novo assembler	Solexa, Illumina, DNBSEQ		2012	GPLv3	link
*Licences: OS = Open Source; C = Commercial; C / NC-A = Commercial but free for non-commercial and academics

Different assemblers are designed for different type of read technologies. Reads from second generation technologies (called short read technologies) like Illumina are typically short (with lengths of the order of 50-200 base pairs) and have error rates of around 0.5-2%, with the errors chiefly being substitution errors. However, reads from third generation technologies like PacBio and fourth generation technologies like Oxford Nanopore (called long read technologies) are longer with read lengths typically in the thousands or tens of thousands and have much higher error rates of around 10-20% with errors being chiefly insertions and deletions. This necessitates different algorithms for assembly from short and long read technologies.

== Assemblathon ==
There are numerous programs for de novo sequence assembly and many have been compared in the Assemblathon. The Assemblathon is a periodic, collaborative effort to test and improve the numerous assemblers available. Thus far, two assemblathons have been completed (2011 and 2013) and a third is in progress (as of April 2017). Teams of researchers from across the world choose a program and assemble simulated genomes (Assemblathon 1) and the genomes of model organisms whose that have been previously assembled and annotated (Assemblathon 2). The assemblies are then compared and evaluated using numerous metrics.

=== Assemblathon 1 ===
Assemblathon 1 was conducted in 2011 and featured 59 assemblies from 17 different groups and the organizers. The goal of this Assembalthon was to most accurately and completely assemble a genome that consisted of two haplotypes (each with three chromosomes of 76.3, 18.5, and 17.7 Mb, respectively) that was generated using Evolver. Numerous metrics were used to assess the assemblies, including: NG50 (point at which 50% of the total genome size is reached when scaffold lengths are summed from the longest to the shortest), LG50 (number of scaffolds that are greater than, or equal to, the N50 length), genome coverage, and substitution error rate.

- Software compared: ABySS, Phusion2, phrap, Velvet, SOAPdenovo, PRICE, ALLPATHS-LG
- N50 analysis: assemblies by the Plant Genome Assembly Group (using the assembler Meraculous) and ALLPATHS, Broad Institute, USA (using ALLPATHS-LG) performed the best in this category, by an order of magnitude over other groups. These assemblies scored an N50 of >8,000,000 bases.
- Coverage of genome by assembly: for this metric, BGI's assembly via SOAPdenovo performed best, with 98.8% of the total genome being covered. All assemblers performed relatively well in this category, with all but three groups having coverage of 90% and higher, and the lowest total coverage being 78.5% (Dept. of Comp. Sci., University of Chicago, USA via Kiki).
- Substitution errors: the assembly with the lowest substitution error rate was submitted by the Wellcome Trust Sanger Institute, UK team using the software SGA.
- Overall: No one assembler performed significantly better in others in all categories. While some assemblers excelled in one category, they did not in others, suggesting that there is still much room for improvement in assembler software quality.

=== Assemblathon 2 ===
Assemblathon 2 improved on Assemblathon 1 by incorporating the genomes of multiples vertebrates (a bird (Melopsittacus undulatus), a fish (Maylandia zebra), and a snake (Boa constrictor constrictor)) with genomes estimated to be 1.2, 1.0, and 1.6Gbp in length) and assessment by over 100 metrics. Each team was given four months to assemble their genome from Next-Generation Sequence (NGS) data, including Illumina and Roche 454 sequence data.

- Software compared: ABySS, ALLPATHS-LG, PRICE, Ray, and SOAPdenovo
- N50 analysis: for the assembly of the bird genome, the Baylor College of Medicine Human Genome Sequencing Center and ALLPATHS teams had the highest NG50s, at over 16,000,000 and over 14,000,000 bp, respectively.
- Presence of core genes: Most assemblies performed well in this category (~80% or higher), with only one dropping to just over 50% in their bird genome assembly (Wayne State University via HyDA).
- Overall: Overall, the Baylor College of Medicine Human Genome Sequencing Center utilizing a variety of assembly methods (SeqPrep, KmerFreq, Quake, BWA, Newbler, ALLPATHS-LG, Atlas-Link, Atlas-GapFill, Phrap, CrossMatch, Velvet, BLAST, and BLASR) performed the best for the bird and fish assemblies. For the snake genome assembly, the Wellcome Trust Sanger Institute using SGA, performed best. For all assemblies, SGA, BCM, Meraculous, and Ray submitted competitive assemblies and evaluations. The results of the many assemblies and evaluations described here suggest that while one assembler may perform well on one species, it may not perform as well on another. The authors make several suggestions for assembly: 1) use more than one assembler, 2) use more than one metric for evaluation, 3) select an assembler that excels in metrics of more interest (e.g., N50, coverage), 4) low N50s or assembly sizes may not be concerning, depending on user needs, and 5) assess the levels of heterozygosity in the genome of interest.

== See also ==
- Sequence assembly
- Sequence alignment
- De novo transcriptome assembly
