= Cold-seep-1 RNA motif =

Conserved RNA structure

cold-seep-1
- Consensus secondary structure and sequence conservation of cold-seep-1 RNA

Identifiers
- Symbol: cold-seep-1
- Rfam: RF03089

Other data
- RNA type: Gene; sRNA
- SO: SO:0001263
- PDB structures: PDBe

The cold-seep-1 RNA motif is a conserved RNA structure that was discovered by bioinformatics.

Cold-seep-1 motif RNAs are found in environmental DNA samples from a cold seep located in Norway. These metagenomic contigs are quite short, and it is consequently difficult to determine if the RNA motif might be larger than the one that was determined, and similarly difficult to determine which protein-coding genes might be associated with cold-seep-1 RNAs, if any. Therefore, it is ambiguous whether cold-seep-1 RNAs function as cis-regulatory elements or whether they operate in trans, and no hypothesis of the function of cold-seep-1 RNAs has been advanced.
