= Long read =

Long read has multiple meanings:

- Long-form journalism
- Long-read sequencing in DNA sequencing
