= Newbler =

Software for DNA sequencing

- Developer(s): 454 Life Sciences
- Stable release: v2.7 / February 28, 2012; 13 years ago
- Operating system: Linux i386/x86_64
- Type: Bioinformatics
- License: Commercial

Newbler is a software package for de novo DNA sequence assembly. It is designed specifically for assembling sequence data generated by the 454 GS-series of pyrosequencing platforms sold by 454 Life Sciences, a Roche Diagnostics company.

== Usage ==
Newbler can run via a Java GUI (gsAssembler) or the command line (runAssembly). It works natively with the .SFF data output by the sequencer, but is also able to accept FASTA files, containing nucleotide sequences, with or without quality information, and FASTQ files. It will use older Sanger sequence data if appropriately formatted to aid in assembly and scaffolding.

== See also ==
- Sequencing
- Sequence assembly
