= Ion semiconductor sequencing =

DNA sequencing method

Ion semiconductor sequencing is a method of DNA sequencing based on the detection of hydrogen ions that are released during the polymerization of DNA. This is a method of "sequencing by synthesis", during which a complementary strand is built based on the sequence of a template strand.

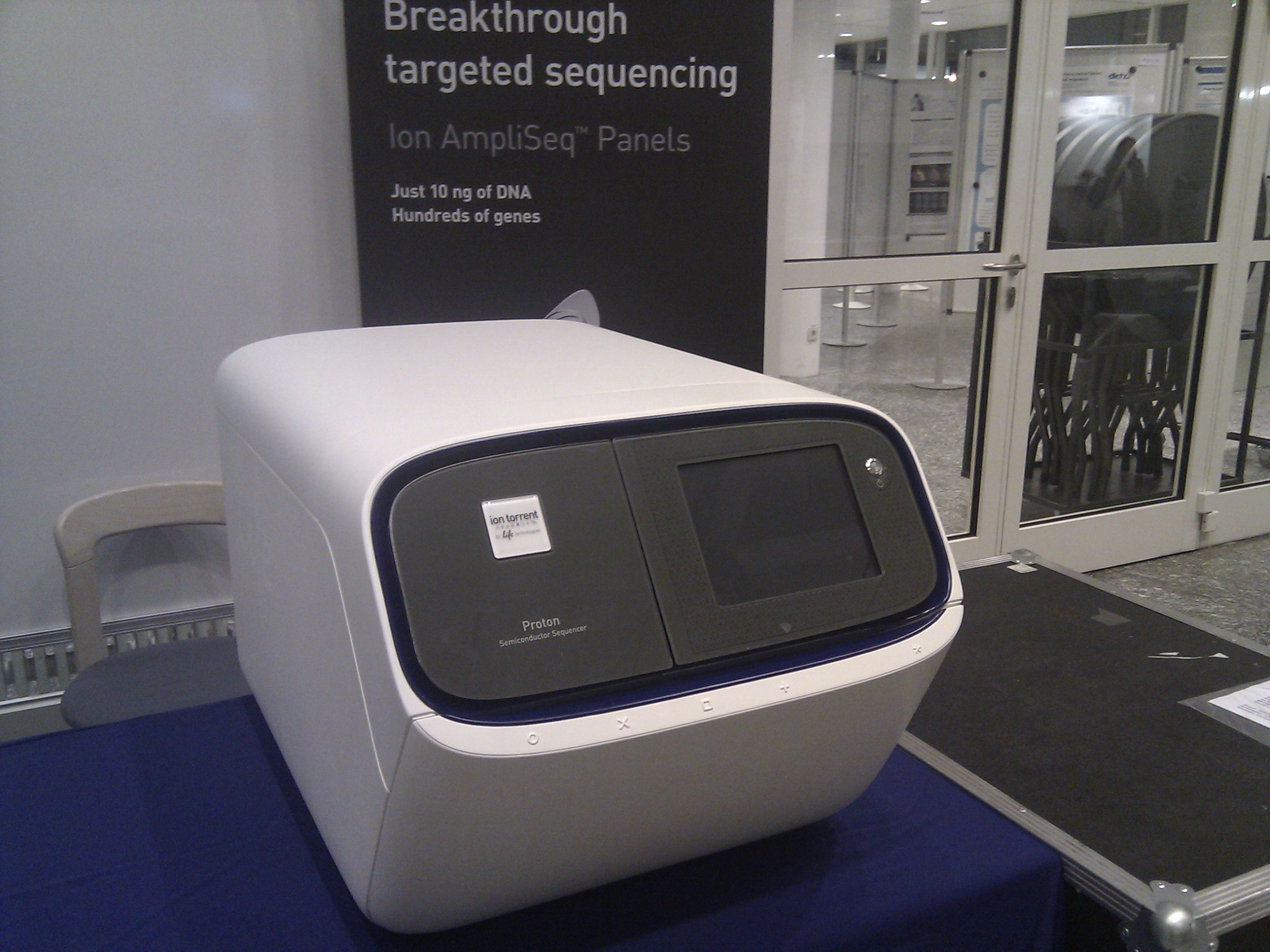
An Ion Proton semiconductor sequencer

A microwell containing a template DNA strand to be sequenced is flooded with a single species of deoxyribonucleotide triphosphate (dNTP). If the introduced dNTP is complementary to the leading template nucleotide, it is incorporated into the growing complementary strand. This causes the release of a hydrogen ion that triggers an ion-sensitive field-effect transistor (ISFET) sensor, which indicates that a reaction has occurred. If homopolymer repeats are present in the template sequence, multiple dNTP molecules will be incorporated in a single cycle. This leads to a corresponding number of released hydrogens and a proportionally higher electronic signal.

This technology differs from other sequencing-by-synthesis technologies in that no modified nucleotides or optics are used. Ion semiconductor sequencing may also be referred to as Ion Torrent sequencing, pH-mediated sequencing, silicon sequencing, or semiconductor sequencing.

== Technology development history ==
The technology was licensed from DNA Electronics Ltd, developed by Ion Torrent Systems Inc. and was released in February 2010. Ion Torrent have marketed their machine as a rapid, compact and economical sequencer that can be utilized in a large number of laboratories as a bench top machine. Roche's 454 Life Sciences is partnering with DNA Electronics on the development of a long-read, high-density semiconductor sequencing platform using this technology.

== Technology ==
The incorporation of deoxyribonucleotide triphosphate into a growing DNA strand causes the release of hydrogen and pyrophosphate.

The release of hydrogen ions indicate if zero, one or more nucleotides were incorporated.

Released hydrogens ions are detected by an ion sensor. Multiple incorporations lead to a corresponding number of released hydrogens and intensity of signal.

=== Sequencing chemistry ===
In nature, the incorporation of a deoxyribonucleoside triphosphate (dNTP) into a growing DNA strand involves the formation of a covalent bond and the release of pyrophosphate and a positively charged hydrogen ion. A dNTP will only be incorporated if it is complementary to the leading unpaired template nucleotide. Ion semiconductor sequencing exploits these facts by determining if a hydrogen ion is released upon providing a single species of dNTP to the reaction.

Microwells on a semiconductor chip that each contain many copies of one single-stranded template DNA molecule to be sequenced and DNA polymerase are sequentially flooded with unmodified A, C, G or T dNTP. If an introduced dNTP is complementary to the next unpaired nucleotide on the template strand it is incorporated into the growing complementary strand by the DNA polymerase. If the introduced dNTP is not complementary there is no incorporation and no biochemical reaction. The hydrogen ion that is released in the reaction changes the pH of the solution, which is detected by an ISFET. The unattached dNTP molecules are washed out before the next cycle when a different dNTP species is introduced.

=== Signal detection ===
Beneath the layer of microwells is an ion sensitive layer, below which is an ISFET ion sensor. All layers are contained within a CMOS semiconductor chip, similar to that used in the electronics industry.

Each chip contains an array of microwells with corresponding ISFET detectors. Each released hydrogen ion then triggers the ISFET ion sensor. The series of electrical pulses transmitted from the chip to a computer is translated into a DNA sequence, with no intermediate signal conversion required. Because nucleotide incorporation events are measured directly by electronics, the use of labeled nucleotides and optical measurements are avoided. Signal processing and DNA assembly can then be carried out in software.

=== Sequencing characteristics ===
The per base accuracy achieved on the Ion Torrent Ion semiconductor sequencer as of February 2011 was 99.6% based on 50 base reads, with 100 Mb per run. The read-length as of February 2011 was 100 base pairs. The accuracy for homopolymer repeats of 5 repeats in length was 98%. Later releases show a read length of 400 base pairs These figures have not yet been independently verified outside of the company.

== Strengths ==
The major benefits of ion semiconductor sequencing are rapid sequencing speed and low upfront and operating costs. This has been enabled by the avoidance of modified nucleotides and optical measurements.

Because the system records natural polymerase-mediated nucleotide incorporation events, sequencing can occur in real-time. In reality, the sequencing rate is limited by the cycling of substrate nucleotides through the system. Ion Torrent Systems Inc., the developer of the technology, claims that each incorporation measurement takes 4 seconds and each run takes about one hour, during which 100-200 nucleotides are sequenced. If the semiconductor chips are improved (as predicted by Moore’s law), the number of reads per chip (and therefore per run) should increase.

The cost of acquiring a pH-mediated sequencer at time of launch was priced at around $50,000 USD, excluding sample preparation equipment and a server for data analysis. The cost per run is also significantly lower than that of alternative automated sequencing methods, at roughly $1,000.

== Limitations ==
If homopolymer repeats of the same nucleotide (e.g. TTTTT) are present on the template strand (strand to be sequenced) then multiple introduced nucleotides are incorporated and more hydrogen ions are released in a single cycle. This results in a greater pH change and a proportionally greater electronic signal. This is a limitation of the system in that it is difficult to enumerate long repeats. This limitation is shared by other techniques that detect single nucleotide additions such as pyrosequencing. Signals generated from a high repeat number are difficult to differentiate from repeats of a similar but different number; e.g., homorepeats of length 7 are difficult to differentiate from those of length 8.

Another limitation of this system is the short read length compared to other sequencing methods such as Sanger sequencing or pyrosequencing. Longer read lengths are beneficial for de novo genome assembly. Ion Torrent semiconductor sequencers produce an average read length of approximately 400 nucleotides per read.

The throughput is currently lower than that of other high-throughput sequencing technologies, although the developers hope to change this by increasing the density of the chip.

== Application ==
The developers of Ion Torrent semiconductor sequencing have marketed it as a rapid, compact and economical sequencer that can be utilized in a large number of laboratories as a bench top machine. The company hopes that their system will take sequencing outside of specialized centers and into the reach of hospitals and smaller laboratories. A January 2011 New York Times article, "Taking DNA Sequencing to the Masses", underlines these ambitions.

Due to the ability of alternative sequencing methods to achieve a greater read length (and therefore being more suited to whole genome analysis) this technology may be best suited to small scale applications such as microbial genome sequencing, microbial transcriptome sequencing, targeted sequencing, amplicon sequencing, or for quality testing of sequencing libraries.
