= Kautz graph =

Example of Kautz graph on 3 characters with string length 2 (on the left) and 3 (on the right); the edges on the left correspond to the vertices on the right.

The Kautz graph $K_M^{N + 1}$ is a directed graph of degree $M$ and dimension $N+ 1$, which has $(M +1)M^{N}$ vertices labeled by all possible strings $s_0 \cdots s_N$ of length $N + 1$ which are composed of characters $s_i$ chosen from an alphabet $A$ containing $M + 1$ distinct symbols, subject to the condition that adjacent characters in the string cannot be equal ($s_i \neq s_{i+ 1}$).

The Kautz graph $K_M^{N + 1}$ has $(M + 1)M^{N + 1}$ edges

$\{(s_0 s_1 \cdots s_N,s_1 s_2 \cdots s_N s_{N + 1})| \; s_i \in A \; s_i \neq s_{i + 1} \} \,$

It is natural to label each such edge of $K_M^{N + 1}$ as $s_0s_1 \cdots s_{N + 1}$, giving a one-to-one correspondence between edges of the Kautz graph $K_M^{N + 1}$ and vertices of the Kautz graph $K_M^{N + 2}$.

Kautz graphs are closely related to De Bruijn graphs.

== Properties ==
- For a fixed degree $M$ and number of vertices $V = (M + 1) M^N$, the Kautz graph has the smallest diameter of any possible directed graph with $V$ vertices and degree $M$.
- All Kautz graphs have Eulerian cycles. (An Eulerian cycle is one which visits each edge exactly once—This result follows because Kautz graphs have in-degree equal to out-degree for each node)
- All Kautz graphs have a Hamiltonian cycle (This result follows from the correspondence described above between edges of the Kautz graph $K_M^{N}$ and vertices of the Kautz graph $K_M^{N + 1}$; a Hamiltonian cycle on $K_M^{N + 1}$ is given by an Eulerian cycle on $K_M^{N}$)
- A degree-$k$ Kautz graph has $k$ disjoint paths from any node $x$ to any other node $y$.

== In computing ==
The Kautz graph has been used as a network topology for connecting processors in high-performance computing and fault-tolerant computing applications: such a network is known as a Kautz network.
