= Standard flowgram format =

Standard flowgram format (SFF) is a binary file format used to encode results of pyrosequencing from the 454 Life Sciences platform for high-throughput sequencing. SFF files can be viewed, edited and converted with DNA Baser SFF Workbench (graphic tool), or converted to FASTQ format with sff2fastq or seq_crumbs.
