= Mathias Uhlén =

Swedish scientist

- Education: Royal Institute of Technology, European Molecular Biology Laboratory
- Scientific career
- Fields: Chemistry; Biology; Microbiology; Biotechnology; Biomedicine
- Institutions: Royal Institute of Technology; Danish Technical University; Karolinska Institutet

Mathias Uhlén (born May 1954) is a Swedish scientist and Professor of Microbiology at Royal Institute of Technology (KTH), Stockholm. After a post-doc period at the EMBL in Heidelberg, Germany, he became professor in microbiology at KTH in 1988. His research is focused on protein science, antibody engineering and precision medicine and range from basic research in human and microbial biology to more applied research, including clinical applications. He is member of several academies and societies, including Royal Swedish Academy of Science (KVA), National Academy of Engineering (NAE) and the Swedish Academy of Engineering Science (IVA). Dr Uhlen was the Founding Director of the national infrastructure Science for Life Laboratory (SciLifeLab) from 2010 to 2015.

== Research ==
His group was the first to describe a number of innovations in science including:

=== Protein engineering ===
This broad concept of Affinity-based protein engineering was developed to use specific binding (affinity) of proteins in combination with protein engineering and it has led to many successful applications widely used in the life science community. This includes (A) engineered protein A and protein G for purification of antibodies (B) affinity tags for purification of recombinant fusion proteins (C) Affibodies – clinically validated protein scaffold binders (D) the first solid phase methods for DNA handling using the biotin - streptavidin system and (E) MabSelect SuRe – alkali-stabled matrix for purification of antibodies. This ligand has been used for the manufacturing of the majority of therapeutic antibodies on the market today.

=== Sequencing by synthesis ===
This concept involves the detecting of the incorporation of nucleotides in real-time during synthesis by a DNA polymerase and to use this for DNA sequencing. The concept, first described in 1993, depends on several important underlying technologies, including attachment of DNA to solid supports, the use of engineered polymerases for synthesis a complementary nucleotide and the detection of the incorporated nucleotide to generate sequencing. This was used by the Pyrosequencing method leading to the first massive parallel sequencing instrument (454). The concept of sequencing by synthesis is now used in all major "next generation sequencing" systems, including 454, PacBio, IonTorrent, Illumina and MGI.

=== Map of the human proteome ===
The Human Protein Atlas program started in 2003 with the aim to contribute to the holistic understanding of all the proteins encoded from our DNA. The objective of the program is to map all the human proteins in cells, tissues, and organs using integration of various omics technologies, including antibody-based imaging, mass spectrometry-based proteomics, transcriptomics, and systems biology. The ultimate aim for the project is a complete understanding of the functions and interactions of all proteins and where in the different cells and tissues they reside. During the first 20 years, the open access resource has launched more than 5 million web pages with 10 million high-resolution microscope images, to allow individual researchers both in industry and academia to explore the proteome space across the human body. The resource consists of various sections, spanning from tissues, brain, immune cells, blood proteins, diseases and structures. The Tissue Atlas paper, is one of the most cited publications from Europe in the last 10 years.
