= Pascal Mayer =

French biophysicist

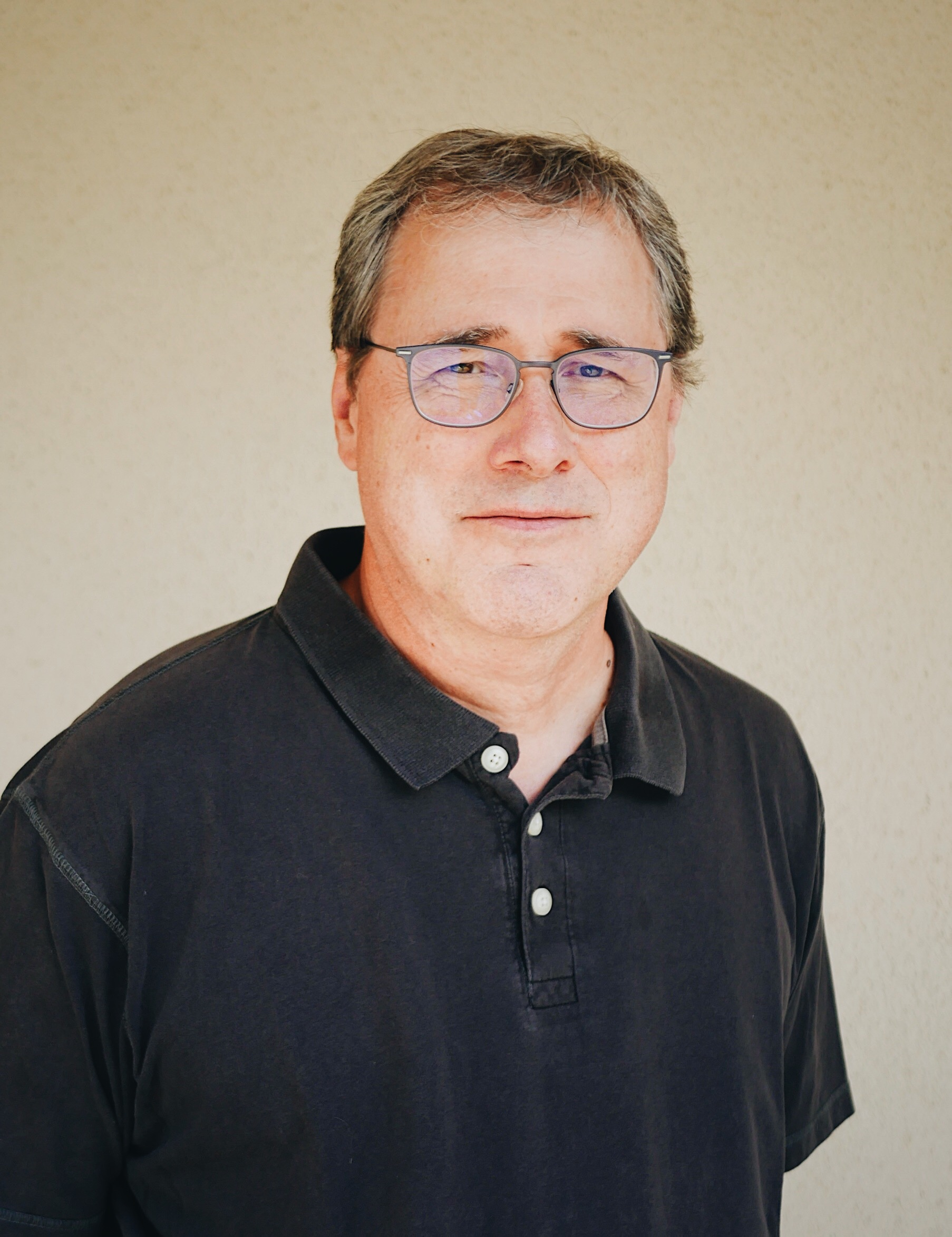
- Born: July 14, 1963 (age 63)
- Known for: His research paved the way for cheap and rapid DNA sequencing

Pascal Mayer is a French biophysicist and entrepreneur specializing in biomolecular analyses for diagnostics, predictive medicine and drug discovery.

He is known for his work that led to the development of a next-generation for an inexpensive and rapid DNA sequencing technology. that would become the basis of Illumina technology, and for which he was awarded the 2022 Breakthrough Prize in life sciences category. He is currently the president of Alphanosos.

He was awarded the Canada Gairdner International Award in 2024.

He is the co-founder of Alphanosos, a company in applied AI for sustainable health and bio-industries that develops natural health products based on patentable mixes of plant extracts.

== Biography ==
Pascal Mayer was born in 1963 in Moselle and grew up in a small town that is located in the mining region called Stiring-Wendel. He graduated in 1988 with a Master's degree (DEA) in Molecular Biology from the Louis Pasteur University of Strasbourg, where he obtained his PhD in Macromolecular Biophysics in 1991

His thesis was devoted to the development of an automated apparatus for measuring electrical birefringence on gel and to the experimental study of DNA dynamics during pulsed-field electrophoresis.

From 1991 to 1994, he completed a postdoctoral fellowship at the University of Ottawa (Canada) where he demonstrated how a new method for separating DNA in free solution could significantly improve DNA sequencing methods.

During a second postdoctoral fellowship at the Paul Pascal Research Center of the CNRS, from 1994 to 1996, he invented a method and wrote software to analyze video-microscopy images of blurred moving objects (DNA molecules) using spatio-temporal correlation maps.

In November 1996, he joined the GlaxoSmithKline group in Geneva, where his work led to the filing of patents revealing the new method of massive parallel DNA sequencing, subsequently acquired by the British company Solexa created by Shankar Balasubramanian and David Klenerman, whose start-up was ultimately acquired by Illumina. These patents have enabled the creation of a rapid, robust and inexpensive DNA sequencing technique (one day and around $600 for the resequencing of a complete human genome), which is now used on a large scale. In this respect, Pascal Mayer received the Breakthrough Prize in life sciences category in 2022 (alongside these two British scientists) and the Canada Gairdner International Award in 2024. This technology enabled the rapid sequencing of SARS-CoV-2 (Covid-19) in 2020 and the regular monitoring of genetic mutations of the different variants.

In 2014, he co-founded the company Alphanosos, located in Riom (Auvergne). In his company he has made several developments so far :

- anti-coronavirus SARS-CoV2, validated in a lethal mouse model (efficacy in this model comparable to convalescent patient serum), registered as a marketed food supplement, with the aim of carrying out a clinical study. Also note in vitro activity against cold and H1N1 flu viruses.
- natural antibacterials, patented in the European Union and 15 countries including the USA, active against bacteria multiresistant to traditional antibiotics, used in dermatological products already marketed, and validated by a clinical study.
- anti-cancer (colorectal and epidermoid) in vitro on cell lines, specific to cancer cells (no measurable effect on non-cancer cell lines), experiments carried out with EPFL.
- antibacterials based on IFRA compounds (perfume) for anti-bad odor ingredient, in partnership with Eurofragance.
- successful technical evaluation with L'Oréal (generative AI of plant mixture extracts on dermatological application)
- dermatological application for dogs

== Awards ==
- 2022: Breakthrough Prize
- 2024: Gairdner Prize
- 2026: Princess of Asturias Award
- 2026: Wolf Prize in Chemistry
