= GATC Biotech =

German company

GATC Biotech AG
- Company type: Limited Company
- Industry: Biotechnology
- Founded: 1990; 36 years ago
- Headquarters: Konstanz, Germany
- Subsidiaries: GATC Biotech AB, Stockholm, Sweden (100%); GATC Biotech Ltd., Cambridge, United Kingdom (100%); GATC Biotech SARL, Marseille, France (100%)
- Website: www.eurofinsgenomics.eu

GATC Biotech was a German company specialist in DNA and RNA sequencing for academic and industrial partners worldwide. The company offered sequencing and bioinformatics solutions from single samples up to large-scale projects. 'The Genome and Diagnostic Centre' focusing on next and third-generation sequencing was based in the headquarters in Constance, Germany. The fully automated NGS laboratories were certified under ISO 17025. The Sanger sequencing business was located in 'The European Custom Sequencing Centre' in Cologne, Germany. The proximity to Cologne Bonn Cargo GmbH served as the logistical hub within Europe. GATC Biotech was acquired by Eurofins Genomics (part of Eurofins Scientific) in July 2017.

== History ==
Founded in 1990 the company concentrated in the early days on commercialising a nonradioactive sequencing technology platform, patented by Prof. Pohl, one of the founders of GATC.

The direct blotting electrophoresis system, the GATC 1500 was utilised in the European Saccharomyces cerevisiae genome project. In 1996 started the transformation from an instrument manufacturer to a service provider in the field of DNA and RNA sequencing. As part of the Gene Alliance, founded in 1998, the company was involved in the large-scale genome analysis project Aspergillus niger funded by DSM (The Netherlands) and finished in 2001.

In 2006 the company started to develop the next generation sequencing business division adding the Europe's first commercial PacBio RS platform in 2011.

In July 2017 GATC Biotech was acquired by Eurofins Genomics (part of Eurofins Scientific).

== Structure of the company ==
GATC Biotech was a limited company and had several subsidiaries in Europe.

- GATC Biotech AB, Stockholm, Sweden (100%)
- GATC Biotech Ltd., Cambridge, United Kingdom (100%)
- GATC Biotech SARL, Marseille, France (100%)

== Products ==
The range of products covers the Sanger sequencing applications as well as next generation sequencing, such as de novo sequencing, human exome sequencing for clinical settings and RNA-Seq.
