= Solid phase sequencing =

The principle of solid phase DNA sequencing was described in 1989 based on binding of biotinylated DNA to streptavidin-coated magnetic beads and elution of single DNA strands selectively using alkali. The method allowed robotic applications suitable for clinical sequencing, but the magnetic handling has also found frequent use in many molecular applications, including sample handling for DNA diagnostics. The use of solid phase methods for DNA handling is now frequently used as an integrated part of many of the next generation DNA sequencing methods, as well as numerous molecular diagnostics applications.
