= IsoBase =

Database for identifying functionally related proteins

Content
- Description: functionally related proteins across PPI networks.
- Organisms: Saccharomyces cerevisiae Drosophila melanogaster Caenorhabditis elegans Mus musculus Homo sapiens

Contact
- Research center: Massachusetts Institute of Technology
- Laboratory: Computer Science and Artificial Intelligence Laboratory
- Authors: Daniel Park
- Primary citation: Park & al. (2011)

Access
- Website: http://isobase.csail.mit.edu/

IsoBase is a database identifying functionally related proteins integrating sequence data and protein–protein interaction networks.

== See also ==
- Protein–protein interaction
- Homology (biology)
