= Pacific Biosciences =

American biotechnology company

Coordinates: 37.4787°N 122.1507°W

Pacific Biosciences of California, Inc.
- Type: Public
- Traded as: Nasdaq: PACB; Russell 2000 Component
- Industry: Biotechnology
- Founded: 2004; 22 years ago
- Headquarters: Menlo Park, California, United States
- Key people: Christian Henry (CEO and president); John F. Milligan (chairman of the board)
- Revenue: ▲US$200.5 million (2023)
- Net income: ▲US$−306.7 million (2023)
- Total assets: ▲US$1.75 billion (2023)
- Number of employees: 575 (Q4 2024)
- Website: pacb.com

Pacific Biosciences of California, Inc. (a.k.a. PacBio) is an American biotechnology company founded in 2004 that develops and manufactures systems for gene sequencing and some novel real time biological observation. PacBio has two principal sequencing platforms: single-molecule real-time sequencing (SMRT), based on the properties of zero-mode waveguides and sequencing by binding (SBB) chemistry, which uses native nucleotides and scarless incorporation for DNA binding and extension.

== History ==
The company was founded based on research done at Cornell University that combined semiconductor processing and photonics with biotechnology research. Three graduate students in the lab of Professors Watt W. Webb — Jonas Korlach — and Harold Craighead — Steve Turner and Mathieu Foquet — became the first employees.

It began under the name Nanofluidics, Inc. The company raised nearly US$400,000,000 in six rounds of primarily venture capital financing, making it one of the most capitalized startups in 2010 leading up to their public offering in October of that year. Key investors included Mohr Davidow Ventures, Kleiner, Perkins, Caufield & Byers, Alloy Ventures, and Wellcome Trust.

The company's first commercial product, the PacBio RS, was sold to a limited set of customers in 2010 and was commercially released in early 2011. A subsequent version of the sequencer called the PacBio RS II was released in April 2013.

=== Leadership ===
In 2004, Kleiner Perkins entrepreneur-in-residence Hugh Martin became CEO. On 6 January 2012 board member Michael Hunkapiller, PhD assumed the role of CEO. Hunkapiller retired in September 2020, and was replaced by chairman of the board Christian Henry. Henry was a former executive VP and chief commercial officer of Illumina before joining the board at PacBio in July 2018.

=== Illumina: attempted acquisition ===
On 1 November 2018, Illumina, Inc. agreed to purchase PacBio for US$1.2 billion in cash. The deal was expected to close in the fourth quarter of 2019. In December 2019, the Federal Trade Commission sued to block the acquisition. The deal was abandoned with an announcement on 2 January 2020. Illumina further agreed to pay Pacific Biosciences a $98 million US termination fee plus previously agreed upon deal extension payments of $22 million US in February and $6 million US in March 2020.

== Sequencing technology ==
=== Sequencing instruments ===
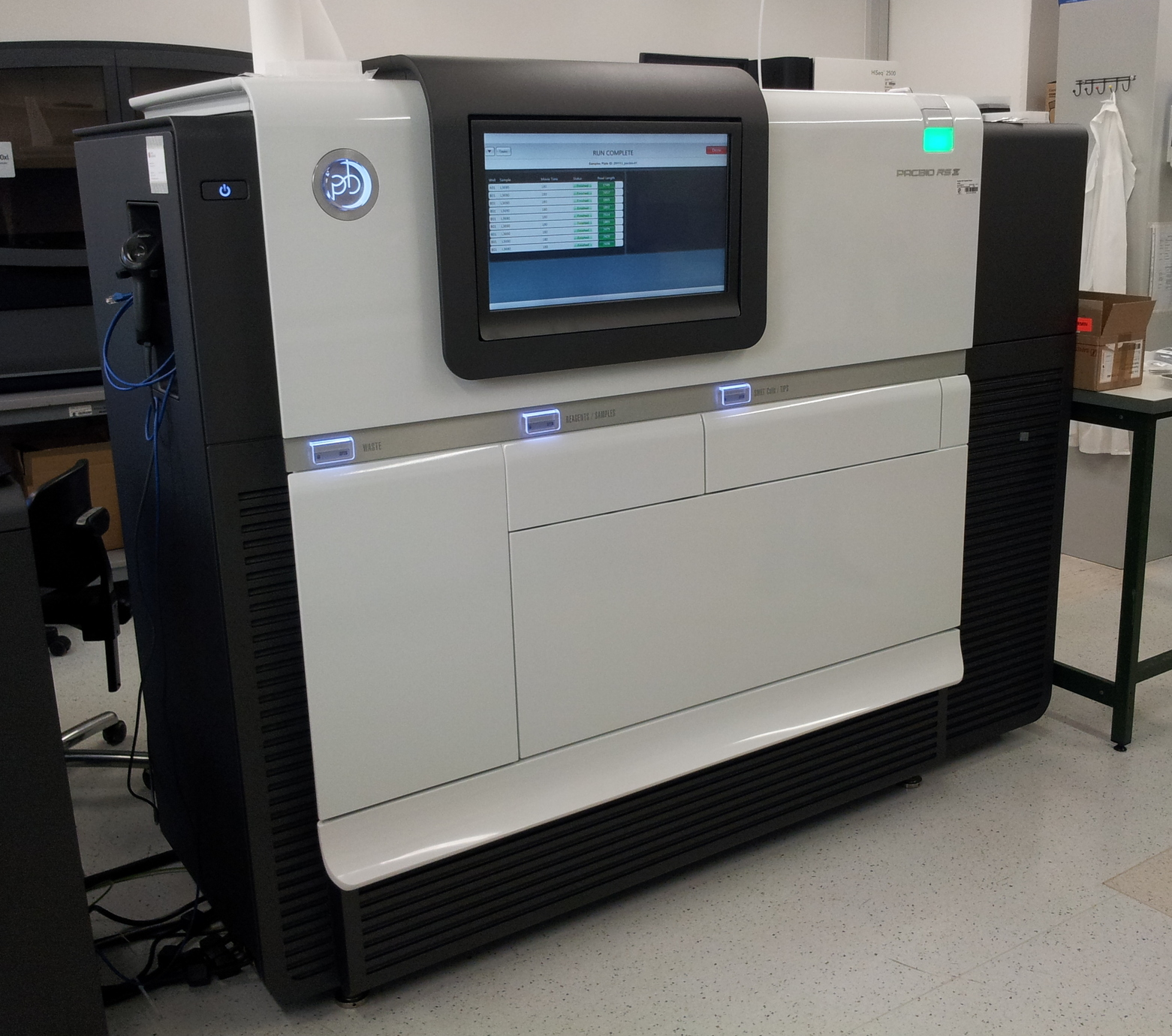
A PacBio RSII sequencer

PacBio Revio long-read sequencer

The company's first scientific instrument, called the PacBio RS, was released to a limited set of customers in late 2010., with full commercial release in early 2011. Sequencing provider GATC Biotech was selected by Pacific Biosciences as its first European service provider in late 2010. A new version of the sequencer was released in April 2013 it produced longer sequence reads and higher throughput than the original RS instrument. The RS instrument will officially be supported until the end of 2021. In September 2015, the company released a new sequencing instrument, the Sequel System, with increased sequencing capacity at a smaller size and lower price compared to the PacBio RS II. Subsequently, in October 2022, PacBio launched a new sequencing system, which can sequence 1,300 human genomes per year as compared to 86 per year of the previous PacBio sequencing machines.

=== Reagents and SMRT Cells ===
To use either instrument, customers must also purchase reagent packs for DNA preparation and sequencing and small consumables called "SMRT Cells." Cells for early forms of the sequencer are slightly less than one-centimeter square and contains tens of thousands of zero-mode waveguides, whereas newer systems have a higher density of cells and contain 25 million zero-mode waveguides (ZMWGs), allowing for faster DNA sequencing.

=== Software and applications ===
Their secondary analysis bioinformatics product for the RS, called “SMRT Analysis”, was open source. For the Sequel system the secondary analysis software was reorganized as the "SMRT Link" application. In 2013, the company released new bioinformatics tools for automated genome assembly (HGAP) and finishing (Quiver).
