= 10x Genomics =

American biotechnology company

10x Genomics, Inc.
- Formerly: 10X Technologies, Inc.
- Type: Public
- Traded as: Nasdaq: TXG (Class A); Russell 1000 component
- Founded: 2012; 14 years ago
- Founders: Serge Saxonov; Ben Hindson; Kevin Ness
- Headquarters: Pleasanton, California, U.S.
- Key people: Serge Saxonov (CEO); Ben Hindson (president and CSO)
- Revenue: ▼US$611 million (2024)
- Operating income: ▲US$−195 million (2024)
- Net income: ▲US$−183 million (2024)
- Total assets: ▼US$919 million (2024)
- Total equity: ▼US$710 million (2024)
- Number of employees: 1,306 (2024)
- Website: 10xgenomics.com

10x Genomics, Inc. is an American biotechnology company that designs and manufactures sequencing technologies for use in scientific research, with a focus on product development for single-cell and spatial omics.

== History ==
10x Genomics was founded in 2012 by Serge Saxonov, Ben Hindson and Kevin Ness to create advanced testing equipment for use in cellular biology. Prior to starting the company, Saxonov was the founding architect, and director of research and development at 23andMe. Ness left 10x Genomics in December 2016 and in 2018, Justin McAnear, Tesla's former finance chief joined the company as CFO.

In August 2018, the company announced its first acquisition, Epinomics, a biotechnology company focused on the development of new techniques for epigenetics research. Four months later, 10x Genomics acquired Spatial Transcriptomics, a biotechnology company working in the field of spatial genomics. In November 2018, 10x Genomics announced expansion plans including opening a manufacturing facility in Pleasanton, California in early 2019.

10x Genomics announced its initial public offering on September 12, 2019, raising $390M. The company had revenues of $3.32 million in 2015, $27.48 million in 2016, $71.18 million in 2017, $145 million in 2018, and $618.7 million in 2023.

10x Genomics was included on Business Insider's "America's Most Innovative Businesses" 2027 list.

== Arbitration and lawsuit ==
Saxonov, Hindson, and Ness worked together at Quantalife prior to its acquisition by Bio-Rad in 2011 and left in 2012 to launch 10x Genomics. In 2014 an arbitration dispute was brought against the three cofounders by Bio-Rad, claiming they had breached obligations they allegedly owed to Bio-Rad after it acquired Quantalife. In 2015 an arbitrator determined that the founders of 10x Genomics had not breached their obligation to Bio-Rad when they left the company and denied its claims.

In November 2018, a Delaware jury found that 10x Genomics infringed on several University of Chicago patents that were exclusively licensed to Bio-Rad. 10x Genomics were ordered to pay $24 million in damages to Bio-Rad and a 15% royalty on sales. 10x Genomics appealed the verdict but the decision was upheld in August 2020. In July 2021, Bio-Rad and 10x Genomics settled all outstanding lawsuits brought in American federal as well as international courts for an undisclosed amount and the rights for the companies to license each other's patents for single-cell analysis.

== Partnerships ==
In 2025, 10x Genomics announced it was partnering with Arc Institute to support Arc's virtual cell atlas and virtual cell competition.
