= DNA sequencer =

Scientific instrument that automates the DNA sequencing process

A DNA sequencer is a scientific instrument used to automate the process of DNA sequencing. Given a DNA sample, the DNA sequencer is used to determine the sequence of the four bases it contains: G (guanine), C (cytosine), A (adenine), and T (thymine).

== Sequencers ==
DNA sequencer
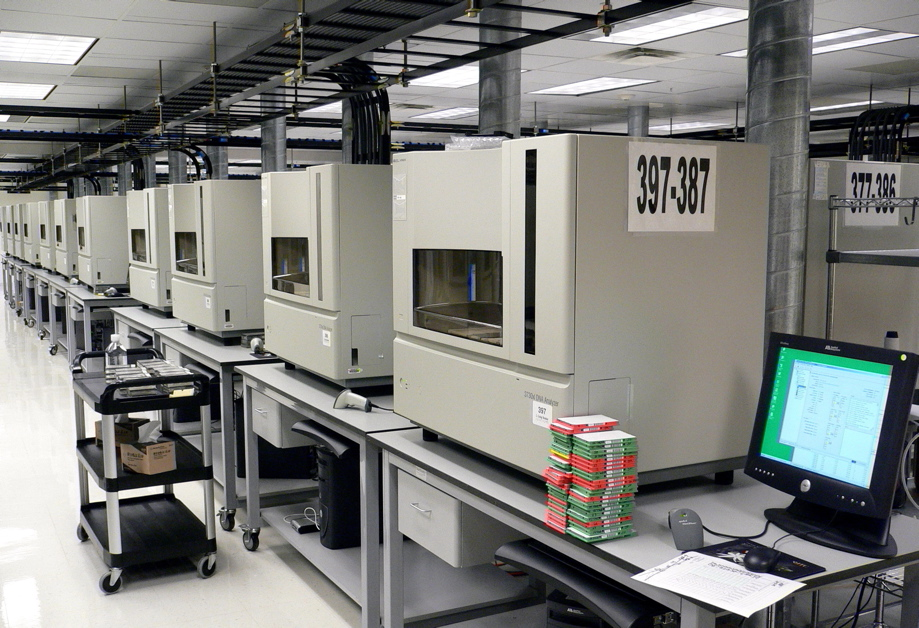
- DNA sequencers
- Manufacturers: Roche, Illumina, Life Technologies, Beckman Coulter, Pacific Biosciences, MGI/BGI, Oxford Nanopore Technologies

The first automated DNA sequencer, invented by Lloyd M. Smith, was introduced by Applied Biosystems in 1987. It used the Sanger sequencing method, a technology which formed the basis of the "first generation" of DNA sequencers and enabled the completion of the Human Genome Project in 2001. This first generation of DNA sequencers are essentially automated electrophoresis systems that detect the migration of labelled DNA fragments. Therefore, these sequencers can also be used in the genotyping of genetic markers where only the length of a DNA fragment(s) needs to be determined (e.g. microsatellites, AFLPs).

The Human Genome Project spurred the development of cheaper, high throughput and more accurate platforms known as Next Generation Sequencers (NGS) to sequence the human genome. These include the 454, SOLiD and Illumina DNA sequencing platforms. Next generation sequencing machines have increased the rate of DNA sequencing substantially, as compared with the previous Sanger methods. DNA samples can be prepared automatically in as little as 90 mins, while a human genome can be sequenced at 15 times coverage in a matter of days.

More recent, third-generation DNA sequencers such as PacBio SMRT and Oxford Nanopore offer the possibility of sequencing long molecules, compared to short-read technologies such as Illumina SBS or MGI Tech's DNBSEQ.

Because of limitations in DNA sequencer technology, the reads of many of these technologies are short, compared to the length of a genome therefore the reads must be assembled into longer contigs. The data may also contain errors, caused by limitations in the DNA sequencing technique or by errors during PCR amplification. DNA sequencer manufacturers use a number of different methods to detect which DNA bases are present. The specific protocols applied in different sequencing platforms have an impact in the final data that is generated. Therefore, comparing data quality and cost across different technologies can be a daunting task. Each manufacturer provides their own ways to inform sequencing errors and scores. However, errors and scores between different platforms cannot always be compared directly. Since these systems rely on different DNA sequencing approaches, choosing the best DNA sequencer and method will typically depend on the experiment objectives and available budget.

== History ==
The first DNA sequencing methods were developed by Gilbert (1973) and Sanger (1975). Gilbert introduced a sequencing method based on chemical modification of DNA followed by cleavage at specific bases whereas Sanger's technique is based on dideoxynucleotide chain termination. The Sanger method became popular due to its increased efficiency and low radioactivity. The first automated DNA sequencer was the AB370A, introduced in 1986 by Applied Biosystems. The AB370A was able to sequence 96 samples simultaneously, 500 kilobases per day, and reaching read lengths up to 600 bases. This was the beginning of the "first generation" of DNA sequencers, which implemented Sanger sequencing, fluorescent dideoxy nucleotides and polyacrylamide gel sandwiched between glass plates - slab gels. The next major advance was the release in 1995 of the AB310 which utilized a linear polymer in a capillary in place of the slab gel for DNA strand separation by electrophoresis. These techniques formed the base for the completion of the Human Genome Project in 2001. The Human Genome Project spurred the development of cheaper, high throughput and more accurate platforms known as Next Generation Sequencers (NGS). In 2005, 454 Life Sciences released the 454 sequencer, followed by Solexa Genome Analyzer and SOLiD (Supported Oligo Ligation Detection) by Agencourt in 2006. Applied Biosystems acquired Agencourt in 2006, and in 2007, Roche bought 454 Life Sciences, while Illumina purchased Solexa. Ion Torrent entered the market in 2010 and was acquired by Life Technologies (now Thermo Fisher Scientific). And BGI started manufacturing sequencers in China after acquiring Complete Genomics under their MGI arm. These are still the most common NGS systems due to their competitive cost, accuracy, and performance.

More recently, a third generation of DNA sequencers was introduced. The sequencing methods applied by these sequencers do not require DNA amplification (polymerase chain reaction – PCR), which speeds up the sample preparation before sequencing and reduces errors. In addition, sequencing data is collected from the reactions caused by the addition of nucleotides in the complementary strand in real time. Two companies introduced different approaches in their third-generation sequencers. Pacific Biosciences sequencers utilize a method called Single-molecule real-time (SMRT), where sequencing data is produced by light (captured by a camera) emitted when a nucleotide is added to the complementary strand by enzymes containing fluorescent dyes. Oxford Nanopore Technologies is another company developing third-generation sequencers using electronic systems based on nanopore sensing technologies.

== Manufacturers of DNA sequencers ==
DNA sequencers have been developed, manufactured, and sold by the following companies, among others.

=== Roche ===
The 454 DNA sequencer was the first next-generation sequencer to become commercially successful. It was developed by 454 Life Sciences and purchased by Roche in 2007. 454 utilizes the detection of pyrophosphate released by the DNA polymerase reaction when adding a nucleotide to the template strain.

Roche manufactured two systems based on their pyrosequencing technology: the GS FLX+ and the GS Junior System. The GS FLX+ System promises read lengths of approximately 1000 base pairs while the GS Junior System promises 400 base pair reads. A predecessor to GS FLX+, the 454 GS FLX Titanium system was released in 2008, achieving an output of 0.7G of data per run, with 99.9% accuracy after quality filter, and a read length of up to 700bp. In 2009, Roche launched the GS Junior, a bench top version of the 454 sequencer with read length up to 400bp, and simplified library preparation and data processing.

One of the advantages of 454 systems is their running speed. Manpower can be reduced with automation of library preparation and semi-automation of emulsion PCR. A disadvantage of the 454 system is that it is prone to errors when estimating the number of bases in a long string of identical nucleotides. This is referred to as a homopolymer error and occurs when there are 6 or more identical bases in row. Another disadvantage is that the price of reagents is relatively more expensive compared with other next-generation sequencers.

In 2013 Roche announced that they would be shutting down development of 454 technology and phasing out 454 machines completely in 2016 when its technology became noncompetitive.

Roche produces a number of software tools which are optimised for the analysis of 454 sequencing data. Such as,

- GS Run Processor converts raw images generated by a sequencing run into intensity values. The process consists of two main steps: image processing and signal processing. The software also applies normalization, signal correction, base-calling and quality scores for individual reads. The software outputs data in Standard Flowgram Format (or SFF) files to be used in data analysis applications (GS De Novo Assembler, GS Reference Mapper or GS Amplicon Variant Analyzer).
- GS De Novo Assembler is a tool for de novo assembly of whole-genomes up to 3GB in size from shotgun reads alone or combined with paired end data generated by 454 sequencers. It also supports de novo assembly of transcripts (including analysis), and also Protein isoform variant detection.
- GS Reference Mapper maps short reads to a reference genome, generating a consensus sequence. The software is able to generate output files for assessment, indicating insertions, deletions and SNPs. Can handle large and complex genomes of any size.
- Finally, the GS Amplicon Variant Analyzer aligns reads from amplicon samples against a reference, identifying variants (linked or not) and their frequencies. It can also be used to detect unknown and low-frequency variants. It includes graphical tools for analysis of alignments.

=== Illumina ===
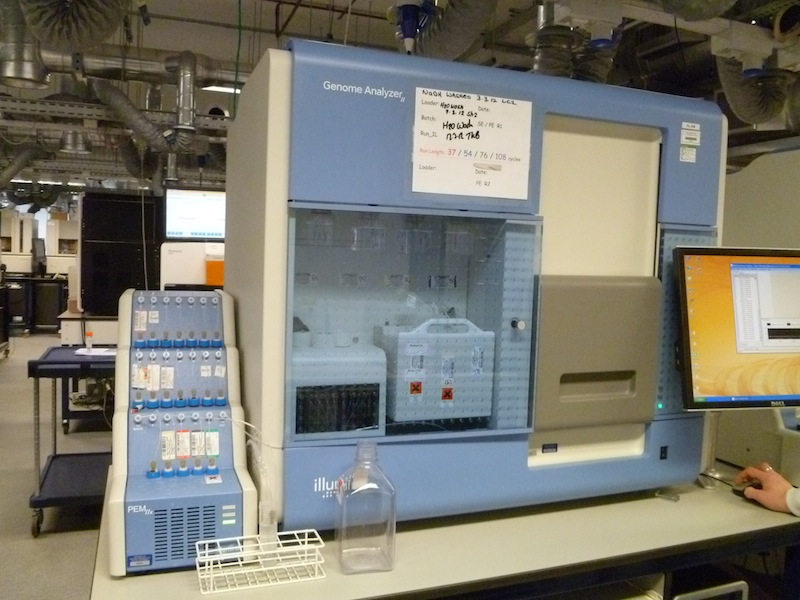
Illumina Genome Analyzer II sequencing machine

Illumina produces a number of next-generation sequencing machines using technology acquired from Manteia Predictive Medicine and developed by Solexa. Illumina makes a number of next generation sequencing machines using this technology including the HiSeq, Genome Analyzer IIx, MiSeq and the HiScanSQ, which can also process microarrays.

The technology leading to these DNA sequencers was first released by Solexa in 2006 as the Genome Analyzer. Illumina purchased Solexa in 2007. The Genome Analyzer uses a sequencing by synthesis method. The first model produced 1G per run. During the year 2009 the output was increased from 20G per run in August to 50G per run in December. In 2010 Illumina released the HiSeq 2000 with an output of 200 and then 600G per run which would take 8 days. At its release the HiSeq 2000 provided one of the cheapest sequencing platforms at $0.02 per million bases as costed by the Beijing Genomics Institute.

In 2011 Illumina released a benchtop sequencer called the MiSeq. At its release the MiSeq could generate 1.5G per run with paired end 150bp reads. A sequencing run can be performed in 10 hours when using automated DNA sample preparation.

The Illumina HiSeq uses two software tools to calculate the number and position of DNA clusters to assess the sequencing quality: the HiSeq control system and the real-time analyzer. These methods help to assess if nearby clusters are interfering with each other.

=== Life Technologies ===
Life Technologies (now Thermo Fisher Scientific) produces DNA sequencers under the Applied Biosystems and Ion Torrent brands. Applied Biosystems makes the SOLiD next-generation sequencing platform, and Sanger-based DNA sequencers such as the 3500 Genetic Analyzer. Under the Ion Torrent brand, Applied Biosystems produces four next-generation sequencers: the Ion PGM System, Ion Proton System, Ion S5 and Ion S5xl systems. The company is also believed to be developing their new capillary DNA sequencer called SeqStudio that will be released early 2018.

SOLiD systems was acquired by Applied Biosystems in 2006. SOLiD applies sequencing by ligation and dual base encoding. The first SOLiD system was launched in 2007, generating reading lengths of 35bp and 3G data per run. After five upgrades, the 5500xl sequencing system was released in 2010, considerably increasing read length to 85bp, improving accuracy up to 99.99% and producing 30G per 7-day run.

The limited read length of the SOLiD has remained a significant shortcoming and has to some extent limited its use to experiments where read length is less vital such as resequencing and transcriptome analysis and more recently ChIP-Seq and methylation experiments. The DNA sample preparation time for SOLiD systems has become much quicker with the automation of sequencing library preparations such as the Tecan system.

The colour space data produced by the SOLiD platform can be decoded into DNA bases for further analysis, however software that considers the original colour space information can give more accurate results. Life Technologies has released BioScope, a data analysis package for resequencing, ChiP-Seq and transcriptome analysis. It uses the MaxMapper algorithm to map the colour space reads.

=== Beckman Coulter ===
Beckman Coulter (now Danaher) has previously manufactured chain termination and capillary electrophoresis-based DNA sequencers under the model name CEQ, including the CEQ 8000. The company now produces the GeXP Genetic Analysis System, which uses dye terminator sequencing. This method uses a thermocycler in much the same way as PCR to denature, anneal, and extend DNA fragments, amplifying the sequenced fragments.

=== Pacific Biosciences ===
Pacific Biosciences produces the PacBio RS and Sequel sequencing systems using a single molecule real time sequencing, or SMRT, method. This system can produce read lengths of multiple thousands of base pairs. Higher raw read errors are corrected using either circular consensus - where the same strand is read over and over again - or using optimized assembly strategies. Scientists have reported 99.9999% accuracy with these strategies. The Sequel system was launched in 2015 with an increased capacity and a lower price.

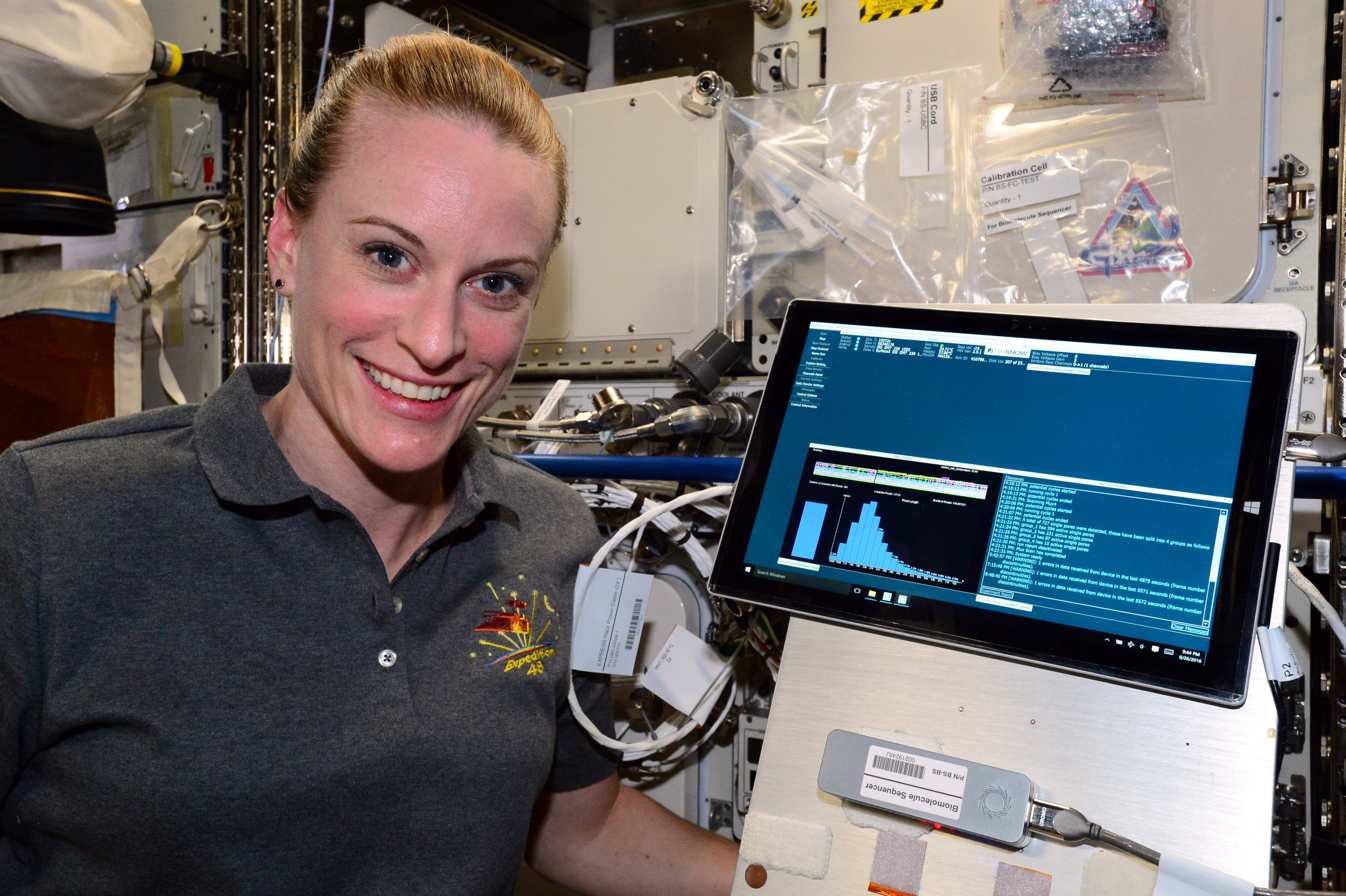
Oxford Nanopore MinION sequencer (lower right) was used in the first-ever DNA sequencing in space in August 2016 by astronaut Kathleen Rubins.

=== Oxford Nanopore ===
Oxford Nanopore Technologies' MinION sequencer is based on evolving nanopore sequencing technology to nucleic acid analyses. The device is four inches long and gets power from a USB port. MinION decodes DNA directly as the molecule is drawn at the rate of 450 bases/second through a nanopore suspended in a membrane. Changes in electric current indicate which base is present. Initially, the device was 60 to 85 percent accurate, compared with 99.9 percent in conventional machines. Even inaccurate results may prove useful because it produces long read lengths. In early 2021, researchers from University of British Columbia has used special molecular tags and able to reduce the five-to-15 per cent error rate of the device to less than 0.005 per cent even when sequencing many long stretches of DNA at a time. There are two more product iterations based on MinION; the first one is the GridION which is a slightly larger sequencer that processes up to five MinION flow cells at once. And, the second one is the PromethION which uses as many as 100,000 pores in parallel, more suitable for high volume sequencing.

=== MGI ===
MGI produces high-throughput sequencers for scientific research and clinical applications such as DNBSEQ-G50, DNBSEQ-G400, and DNBSEQ-T7, under a proprietary DNBSEQ technology. It is based upon DNA nanoball sequencing and combinatorial probe anchor synthesis technologies, in which DNA nanoballs (DNBs) are loaded onto a patterned array chip via the fluidic system, and later a sequencing primer is added to the adaptor region of DNBs for hybridization. DNBSEQ-T7 can generate short reads at a very large scale—up to 60 human genomes per day. DNBSEQ-T7 was used to generate 150 bp paired-end reads, sequencing 30X, to sequence the genome of SARS-CoV-2 or COVID-19 to identify the genetic variants predisposition in severe COVID-19 illness. Using a novel technique the researchers from China National GeneBank sequenced PCR-free libraries on MGI's PCR-free DNBSEQ arrays to obtain for the first time a true PCR-free whole genome sequencing. MGISEQ-2000 was used in single-cell RNA sequencing to study the underlying pathogenesis and recovery in COVID-19 patients, as published in Nature Medicine.

== Comparison ==
Current offerings in DNA sequencing technology show a dominant player: Illumina (December 2019), followed by PacBio, MGI and Oxford Nanopore.

Comparing metrics and performance of next-generation DNA sequencers.
Sequencer	Ion Torrent PGM	454 GS FLX	HiSeq 2000	SOLiDv4	PacBio	Sanger 3730xl	MGI DNBSEQ-G400
Manufacturer	Ion Torrent (Life Technologies)	454 Life Sciences (Roche)	Illumina	Applied Biosystems (Life Technologies)	Pacific Biosciences	Applied Biosystems (Life Technologies)	MGI
Sequencing Chemistry	Ion semiconductor sequencing	Pyrosequencing	Polymerase-based sequence-by-synthesis	Ligation-based sequencing	Phospholinked fluorescent nucleotides	Dideoxy chain termination	Polymerase-based sequence-by-synthesis
Amplification approach	Emulsion PCR	Emulsion PCR	Bridge amplification	Emulsion PCR	Single-molecule; no amplification	PCR	DNA nanoball (DNB) generation
Data output per run	100-200 Mb	0.7 Gb	600 Gb	120 Gb	0.5 - 1.0 Gb	1.9~84 Kb	1440 Gb / 1500-1800M reads
Accuracy	99%	99.9%	99.9%	99.94%	88.0% (>99.9999% CCS or HGAP)	99.999%	99.90%
Time per run	2 hours	24 hours	3–10 days	7–14 days	2–4 hours	20 minutes - 3 hours	3–5 days
Read length	200-400 bp	700 bp	100x100 bp paired end	50x50 bp paired end	14,000 bp (N50)	400-900 bp	100/150/200 bp paired end
Cost per run	US$350	US$7,000	US$6,000 (30x human genome)	US$4,000	$125–300 USD	US$4 (single read/reaction)	N/A
Cost per Mb	US$1.00	US$10	US$0.07	US$0.13	$0.13 - US$0.60	US$2400	$0.007
Cost per instrument	US$80,000	US$500,000	US$690,000	US$495,000	US$695,000	US$95,000	N/A
