= Qubit fluorometer =

Lab instrument

The Qubit fluorometer is a laboratory instrument developed and distributed by Invitrogen, which is now a part of Thermo Fisher. It is used for the quantification of DNA, RNA, and protein. The first model of the Qubit was a winner of the 2007 R&D 100 award from R&D Magazine. The Qubit Flex, a later model of the Qubit, was a finalist for the same award in 2020.

== Method ==
The Qubit fluorometer uses fluorescent dyes to determine the concentration of either nucleic acids or proteins in a sample. Specialized fluorescent dyes bind specifically to the substances of interest.

The Qubit assays were previously developed and manufactured by Molecular Probes (now part of Life Technologies). Each dye is specialized for one type of molecule (DNA, RNA, or protein). These dyes exhibit extremely low fluorescence until bound to their target molecule. Upon binding to DNA, the dye molecules assume a more rigid shape and increase in fluorescence by several orders of magnitude, most likely due to intercalation between the bases.

The Qubit fluorometer correlates the level of fluorescence with known concentrations of probes. This process enables it to transform the fluorescence data into a quantified concentration measurement. Different kits are required for different concentration ranges.

Reagent/Assay	Assay range	Sample starting concentration range
Qubit dsDNA HS Assay	0.2–100 ng	10 pg/μL–100 ng/μL
Qubit dsDNA BR Assay	2–1,000 ng	100 pg/μL–1 μg/μL
Qubit ssDNA Assay	1-200 ng	50 pg/μL-200 ng/μL
Qubit RNA Assay	5–100 ng	250 pg/μL–100 ng/μL
Qubit RNA BR Assay	20–1,000 ng	1 ng/μ-1 μg/μL
Qubit Protein Assay*	0.25–5 μg	12.5 μg/mL–5 mg/mL

== Versions ==
The second generation, the Qubit 2.0 Fluorometer, was released in 2010, and the 3rd generation as Qubit 3.0 in 2014. The newest version is the 4th generation Qubit 4, introduced in 2017.
