= Applera =

American Fortune 1000 company

Applera Corporation
- Industry: Biotechnology
- Predecessor: Life Sciences Division of Perkin-Elmer
- Defunct: 2006
- Fate: Spun off Celera Genomics in 2006, name changed to Applied Biosystems
- Headquarters: Norwalk, Connecticut, United States

Applera Corporation of Norwalk, Connecticut, at #874 on the 2007 Fortune 1000 list, was one of the largest international biotechnology companies based in the United States. It was the successor company to what was the Life Sciences Division of Perkin-Elmer Corporation. Applera was not publicly traded, but instead it consisted of two major groups which are publicly traded tracking stocks in the proteomics industrial sector. These two groups were the S&P 500 listed Applera Corp-Applied Biosystems Group of Foster City, California, and Applera Corp-Celera Genomics Group of Rockville, Maryland. In 2006, the company spun off the Celera Genomics group and changed its name from Applera to Applied Biosystems.

As the former Perkin-Elmer, Applera had a history dating back to 1931. But more precisely, its history dates from 1999, when Perkin-Elmer effectively split in half, and sold off its more traditional half of the business to EG&G Inc. As part of the deal, it also sold the Perkin-Elmer name, because that most properly associated with that traditional line of products, and EG&G then became the new PerkinElmer. At that point the remaining Connecticut Life Sciences company issued its two tracking stocks, and also changed its own name to PE Corporation. The Applied Biosystems group had earlier already been renamed PE Biosystems, and it retained that name in the first incarnation of its tracking stock. In 2000, the Applied Biosystems name was restored to the group, with the new stock ticker symbol ABI, and PE Corporation became Applera, a combination of its two components' names, Appl^{(iedCel)}era.

== Board of directors ==
The Applera Corporation Directors oversaw the parent corporation along with the operations of both tracking stock groups, and consequently they had the responsibility of fairly balancing the interests of both groups of investors in each stock.

- Joseph F. Abely, Jr., director since 1984, retired chairman and CEO of Sea-Land Corporation
- Robert H. Hayes, Ph.D., director since 1985, Philip Caldwell Professor at Harvard Business School
- Richard H. Ayers, director since 1988, retired chairman and CEO of The Stanley Works
- Jean-Luc Bélingard, director since 1993, CEO of Pierre Fabre S.A.
- Carolyn W. Slayman, Ph.D., director since 1994, Sterling Professor and deputy dean of Yale University School of Medicine
- Orin R. Smith, director since 1995, chairman and CEO of Engelhard Corporation
- Tony L. White, director since 1995, chairman, president and CEO of Applera Corporation
- Georges C. St. Laurent, Jr., director since 1996, principal of St. Laurent Properties and former CEO of Western Bank (Oregon)
- Arnold J. Levine, Ph.D., director since 1999, president and CEO of Rockefeller University
- Theodore E. Martin, director since 1999, retired president and CEO of Barnes Group Inc.
- James R. Tobin, director since 1999, president and CEO of Boston Scientific Corporation

== History ==
The original Perkin-Elmer, and then its successor PE Corporation and Applera Corporation have been headquartered in Norwalk, Connecticut. The company address is at 50 Danbury Rd.

In the early 1990s, Perkin-Elmer, which had been a maker of diverse electronic instruments and analytical and optical equipment, established strong ties with groups closely involved with the business of decoding the human genome. By the late 1990s, Perkin-Elmer's Life Sciences division had become centrally involved in highly publicized intense competition against the public consortium that was also working on the massive task. Consequently, Perkin-Elmer's people and companies became among the most famous players of the decade in biotechnology and in that segment of the technology bubble. In the process, Perkin-Elmer divided and transformed itself into Applera, a company entirely focused in life sciences.

Beginning in 1990, the U.S. government approved financing to support the Human Genome Project (HGP). James D. Watson, who founded the public consortium, forecast that the project could be completed in 15 years from its 1990 starting date, at a cost of US$3 billion. The HGP was a public consortium of eight university centers funded through the U.S. Department of Energy, the National Institutes of Health and the Wellcome Trust of London. The government-backed project targeted completion of human DNA mapping by the year 2005.

In 1993, Perkin-Elmer acquired a key equipment maker, Applied Biosystems, Inc., and that stock's symbol ABIO ceased trading on the NASDAQ exchange, as it became a division of Perkin-Elmer. Michael W. Hunkapiller, Ph.D., who had been Applied Biosystem's chairman, president and CEO since 1983, became a senior vice president of Perkin-Elmer, and president of the Applied and PE Biosystems Divisions.

In 1994, Perkin-Elmer reported net revenues of over $1 billion, of which Life Sciences accounted for 42% of the business. The company has 5,954 employees. The new competitive genomics industry had formed for the development of new pharmaceuticals, based on the work of the Human Genome Project. The Applied Biosystems Division made thermal cyclers and automated sequencers for these new genomics companies.

In 1995, Perkin-Elmer sold its 30,000th thermal cycler. To meet Human Genome Project goals, Perkin-Elmer developed mapping kits with markers every 10 million bases along each chromosome. Also that year, DNA fingerprinting using polymerase chain reaction (PCR) became accepted in court as reliable forensic evidence. In 1993, Perkin-Elmer had become the world's leading manufacturer of instruments and reagents for (PCR). It marketed PCR reagents kits in alliance with Hoffman-La Roche Inc.

In 1996, Perkin-Elmer acquired Tropix, Inc., a chemiluminescence company, for its life sciences division.

=== PE Applied Biosystems Division ===
Also In 1996, Tony L. White from Baxter International Inc. became president and chief executive officer of Perkin-Elmer and reorganized it into two separate operating divisions, Analytical Instruments and PE Applied Biosystems. The PE Applied Biosystems division accounted for half of Perkin-Elmer's total revenue, with net revenues up by 26%.

In 1997, Perkin-Elmer revenues reached almost US$1.3 billion, of which PE Applied Biosystems was US$653 million. Acquisitions included GenScope, Inc., and Linkage Genetics, Inc., which combined with Zoogen to form PE AgGen, focused on genetic analysis services for plant and animal breeding. Partnerships were begun with Hyseq, Inc., on the new DNA chip technology, and also with Tecan U.S., Inc., on combinatorial chemistry automation systems, and also with Molecular Informatics, Inc. on genetic data management and analysis automated systems.

In 1998, Perkin-Elmer acquired PerSeptive Biosystems (formerly Nasdaq: PBIO), a leader in the bio-instrumentation field where it made biomolecule purification systems for protein analysis. Noubar Afeyan, Ph.D., had been the founder, chairman, and CEO of PerSeptive, and after the acquisition he became a senior vice president and chief business officer of Perkin-Elmer. He had earlier founded and co-built several successful life science and technology startup companies through the 1990s, after earning his Ph.D. in biochemical engineering from the Massachusetts Institute of Technology in 1987.

=== PE Biosystems Division ===
In 1998, Perkin-Elmer formed the PE Biosystems division, by consolidating Applied Biosystems, PerSeptive Biosystems, Tropix and PE Informatics. Informatics was formed from the Perkin-Elmer combination of two other acquisitions, Molecular Informatics and Nelson Analytical Systems, with existing units of Perkin-Elmer.

By 1998, Perkin-Elmer had a presence on the World Wide Web at http://www.perkin-elmer.com.

While planning the next new generation of machines, PE Biosystems' president, Michael W. Hunkapiller, calculated that it would be possible for their own private industry to decode the human genome before the academic consortium could complete it. The company would decode all of the 3.5 billion chemical letters in the human DNA by 2001, at a cost of only US$200 million, about 1/10 of the consortium projected cost of US$3 billion. However, it would mean starting from scratch, eight years already into the consortium's program. It was a bold prediction, given that the consortium target date set by Watson back in 1990 had been the forward year of 2005, only seven years away, and with the consortium already half the way to the completion target date by then.

Also, it meant that Hunkapiller's idea would require competing against his own customers, to all of whom Applied Biosystems sold its sequencing machines and their chemical reagents. However, he calculated that it would also mean doubling the market for that equipment.

Hunkapiller brought in J. Craig Venter to direct the project. Tony L. White, president of the Perkin-Elmer Corporation backed Hunkapiller on the venture. Perkin-Elmer's interest was driven largely by its monopoly, through the equipment of Applied Biosystems, of the market for automated DNA sequencing machines. Venter boldly declared to the media that he would complete the genome decoding by 2001. That bold pronouncement prompted the academic consortium to accelerate their own deadline by a couple years, to 2003.

In May 1998, the company's newly formed unit to accomplish the task, Celera Genomics Group, in Rockville, Maryland, was created to become the definitive source of genomic and related medical information with the goal of sequencing the human genome by the year 2001. Celera became the primary commercial competitor to the government-funded effort of the Human Genome Project. Venter became president and chief scientific officer of Celera.

At the time, Venter operated his own independent lab, The Institute for Genomic Research (TIGR), which had developed a "random shotgun" approach to DNA decoding, making it the most prolific genome lab in the world.

At year end 1998, the PE Biosystems Group's sales reached US$940 million. Its chief new genomics instrument was the ABI PRISM 3700 DNA Analyzer, which it had developed in conjunction with Hitachi, Ltd. The new machine, an electrophoresis-based genetic analysis system, cost US$300,000 each, but was a major leap beyond its predecessor, the 377, and was fully automated, allowing genetic decoding to run around the clock with little supervision. According to Venter, the machine was so revolutionary that it could decode in a single day the same amount of genetic material that most DNA labs could produce in a year.

The partnership sold hundreds of the 3700 analyzers to Celera, and also to others worldwide. The public consortium also bought one of the Applied Biosytems 3700 sequencers, and had plans to buy 200 more. The machine proved to be so fast that by late March 1999 the consortium announced that it had revised its timeline, and would release by the Spring of 2000 a "first draft sequence" for 80% of the human genome.

=== PE Corporation ===
On March 19, 1999, Perkin-Elmer Corporation, as a New York corporation, filed SEC Form S-4/A, to enter a reincorporation merger with a subsidiary of PE Corporation of Delaware. Shareholders of the New York corporation stock (NYSE:PKN) would receive shares in two new stocks instead.

On April 27, 1999, the shareholders of Perkin-Elmer Corporation approved the reorganization of Perkin-Elmer into a pure-play life science company, resulting in the name change to PE Corporation and the de-listing of the PKN stock. Each share of the Perkin-Elmer New York (PKN) was to be exchanged for one share and for 1/2 of a share respectively of the two new common share tracking stocks for the two component Life Sciences groups, PE Biosystems Group (NYSE:PEB) and Celera Genomics Group (NYSE:CRA). ^{(PKN now)}

On April 28, 1999, the two replacement tracking stocks for the new PE Corporation were issued to shareholders. The Pacific Stock Exchange began trading PE Corporation options for the two new stocks that day. Michael W. Hunkapiller remained as senior vice president of PE Corporation, and as president of PE Biosystems. Afeyan initiated and oversaw the creation of the tracking stock for Celera Genomics Group. Then later in 1999 Afeyan left, to co-found Flagship Ventures, an early-stage entrepreneurial venture capital firm. J. Craig Venter remained as senior vice president of PE Corporation and also president of Celera Genomics Group. Tony L. White remained as PE Corporation's chairman, president and chief executive officer.

Other officers who remained in PE Corporation included William B. Sawch, as senior vice president, general counsel and secretary.

On May 6, 1999, the reorganization was made effective, as the Perkin-Elmer Corporation was merged into a temporarily created subsidiary of PE Corporation, a new Delaware corporation. The recapitalization of the company resulted in issuance of the two new classes of common stock, called PE Corporation-PE Biosystems Group Common Stock and PE Corporation-Celera Genomics Group Common Stock. On that date, trading began in both new stocks on the New York Stock Exchange, to great excitement.

On May 28, 1999, as part of the recapitalization and reorganization, the company completed the sale of its traditional business unit, the Analytical Instruments Division to EG&G Inc., along with the Perkin-Elmer name, for US$425 million. EG&G was based in Wellesley, Massachusetts, and made products for diverse industries including automotive, medical, aerospace and photography. On July 14, 1999, that new analytical instruments maker PerkinElmer cut 350 jobs, or 12%, in its cost reduction reorganization.

On June 17, 1999, the board of PE Corporation announced a two-for-one split of PE Biosystems Group Common Stock.

At year end 1999, after the major divestment that year of the former Analytical Instruments Division, the new PE Corporation assets totalled over US$1.5 billion, split between the two Life Sciences groups. Of that, PE Biosystems Group, with 3,500 employees had net revenues of over US$1.2 billion.

By June 2000, the genomics segment of the technology bubble was peaking. Celera Genomics (CRA) and PE Biosystems (PEB) were among five genetics pioneers leading at that time, along with Incyte Genomics (Nasdaq: INCY), Human Genome Sciences (Nasdaq: HGSI), and Millennium Pharmaceuticals (Nasdaq: MLNM). All five of those stocks by then had exceeded a price above $100 a share in the market, before ultimately crashing back down.

=== Applera ===
On November 28, 2000, PE Corporation filed SEC Form 8-K to report its announcement of the change of its name to Applera Corporation. At the same time, PE Biosystems Group changed its name to Applied Biosystems Group, and changed its ticker symbol from PEB to ABI. Both name changes became effective November 30, 2000. Also that date, the parent corporation web site address changed from https://web.archive.org/web/20070929001200/http://www.pecorporation.com/ to https://web.archive.org/web/20070822133148/http://www.applera.com:80/

The combined Applera then had 5,000 employees. PE/Applied Biosystems Group's net revenues rose to almost US$1.4 billion. Celera that year made milestone headlines when it announced that it had completed the sequencing and first assembly of the two largest genomes in history, that of the fruit fly, and of the human.

In 2001, the Applied Biosystems division of Applera reached revenues of US$1.6 billion, and developed a new workstation instrument specifically for the new field of proteomics, which had become Celera's new core business focus, as it shifted away from gene discovery. The instrument analyzed 1,000 protein samples per hour.

In January 2002, J. Craig Venter was pushed out of Celera, when it was decided that the group would make pharmaceuticals instead. Venter lacked experience in pharmaceutical development.

On April 22, 2002, the Celera Genomics Group announced its decision to abandon what had been its core business since its 1998 inception, and to shift the role of marketing data from its genetic database over to its sister company, the Applied Biosystems Group. Celera would instead develop pharmaceutical drugs. Applera CEO Tony L. White had noted earlier that the database business would distract from pharmaceutical development.

Applied Biosystems was a better fit for the database, because Applied already had the huge sales force in place for the marketing of its instruments. Plans were to expand those sales and those of the database into an electronic commerce system.

The database itself, Celera Discovery System (CDS), would remain with Celera, because of shareholder approval complications. Celera would retain responsibility for its maintenance and support to existing customers, and would receive royalties from Applied Biosystems. The database revenues were expected to reach US$100 million for the June fiscal year end, which would be its first profitable year. But it had always faced the problem that its public competitor, the consortium project, provides free data from its own database.

In 2002, Applied Biosystems Group again posted revenues of US$1.6 billion for the year.

In 2004, the long-term Applied Biosystems president, Mike Hunkapiller, retired and Cathy Burzik, who had joined the Group in 2003, replaced him as president of Applied Biosystems Group.

== See also ==
- List of companies based in Norwalk, Connecticut
