= Positional sequencing =

Positional sequencing is a method of sequencing DNA that simultaneously generates information about both identity and location of nucleotide sequences. The method involves detecting the location of sequence specific recognition events (e.g., such as hybridization of probes of known sequence) on single DNA molecules in each read, and generating maps of the location of such events. Multiple reads can be assembled into a consensus map that identifies the multiple locations of a specific sub-sequence. The assembly process is greatly facilitated by knowledge of the location of each sub-sequence, as well as the fact that individual reads produce non-contiguous sequence data over length scales that can be orders of magnitude greater than what can be achieved with Sanger sequencing or nextgen sequencing by synthesis.

A collection of maps may be used to reconstruct single-base resolved sequence in a process analogous to sequence reconstruction in sequencing by hybridization. Ambiguities in the reconstruction of sequences are resolved through the knowledge of the relative position of overlapping sequence specific recognition events. By varying the parameters (e.g., length of read, density of recognition events, resolution of the detector) governing a specific implementation of the method, it is possible to query all size scales of DNA variation, from single nucleotide sequence all the way to large structural variants and chromosomal aneuploidies.

== See also ==
- Sequencing by ligation
