= Development of COVID-19 tests =

== Introduction ==
Timeline of total number of tests in different countries

The COVID-19 transmission is rapid and occurs via inhalation of respiratory droplets or aerosol particles contaminated with SARS-CoV-2. The viral deposition occurs on mucous membranes of nose, mouth, or eyes via sprays and splashes; or direct contact with hands contaminated with SARS-CoV-2 either by respiratory fluids or by touching surfaces contaminated with the virus. Evidence from studies suggests that SARS-CoV-2 aerosols can stay viable in air for about 3 hours, have a half-life of about 1 hour and can survive for more time on steel and plastic while compared to cardboard and copper. Hence, developing a therapy against COVID-19 was progressing at a pandemic speed, yet there is no effective therapy approved by food and drug administration (FDA). Vaccines seem promising and currently include Pfizer-BioNTech vaccine, Moderna vaccine, Oxford/AstraZeneca vaccine, and the Janssen vaccine. But all of these therapeutic strategies cannot offer complete protection against COVID-19 paving way for epidemiological approaches to break the chain of disease transmission. In such an approach, diagnostics is the most crucial tool helping to identify the disease cases leading to isolation as well as contact tracing, thereby preventing other people from coming in contact with the patients or their recent contacts.

The development of COVID-19 tests was a major public health priority during the early months of the COVID-19 pandemic. In January 2020, scientists from China published the first genetic sequences of SARS-CoV-2 via virological.org, a "hub for prepublication data designed to assist with public health activities and research". Researchers around the world used that data to build molecular tests for the virus. Antigen- and antibody-based tests were developed later.

Even once the first tests were created, the supply was limited. As a result, no country had reliable data on the prevalence of virus early in the pandemic. The WHO and other experts called for ramping up testing as the best way to slow the spread of the virus. Shortages of reagent and other testing supplies became a bottleneck for mass testing in the EU, the UK and the US. Early tests also encountered problems with reliability.

== 2020 ==
=== January ===
Public Health England announced a test on the 10th, using a real-time RT-PCR (RdRp gene) assay based on oral swabs. The test detected the presence of any type of coronavirus, including specifically identifying SARS-CoV-2. It was rolled out to twelve laboratories across the United Kingdom on 10 February.

Scientists from China first released information on the viral genome on 10 January 2020. That day the Malaysian Institute for Medical Research (IMR) produced "primers and probes" specific to a SARS-CoV-2 RT-PCR test. The IMR's materials were used to diagnose Malaysia's first patient on 24 January. BGI Group was one of the first companies to receive emergency use approval from China's National Medical Products Administration for a nucleic acid test.

The German nucleic acid testing protocol was published on the 17th. Another early PCR test was developed by Charité University hospital in Berlin, working with academic collaborators in Europe and Hong Kong, and published on the 23rd. It used rtRT-PCR, and formed the basis of 250,000 kits distributed by the World Health Organization (WHO).

In Russia, the first COVID-19 test was developed by the State Research Center of Virology and Biotechnology VECTOR. Production began on 24 January.

In the US, the Centers for Disease Control and Prevention (CDC) developed its SARS-CoV-2 Real Time PCR Diagnostic Panel. The protocol became available on the 28th. One of three tests in early kits failed due to faulty reagents.

=== February ===
South Korean company Kogenebiotech's clinical grade, nucleic acid test (PowerChek Coronavirus) was approved by Korea Centers for Disease Control and Prevention (KCDC) on 4 February.

In Wuhan, BGI opened a makeshift 2000-sq-meter emergency detection laboratory named "Huo-Yan" (Chinese: 火眼, "Fire Eye") on the 5th. It processed more than 10,000 samples/day. Construction required 5 days. The Wuhan Laboratory was followed by Huo-Yan labs in Shenzhen, Tianjin, Beijing, and Shanghai, in a total of 12 cities across China.

On 11 February, the test was approved by the Federal Service for Surveillance in Healthcare in Russia.

In the United States, the CDC refused to let other labs process tests that month, allowing an average of fewer than 100 samples/day to be processed. Tests using two components were not determined to be reliable until the 28th, and only then were state and local laboratories permitted to begin testing. The test was approved by the FDA under an EUA.

=== March ===
Due to limited testing, no countries had reliable data on the prevalence of the virus in their population. Testing variability distorts reported case fatality rates, which were probably overestimated in many countries due to sampling bias. Shortages of reagent and other supplies became a bottleneck for mass testing in the EU and UK and the US.

By 4 March, China reached 50,000 tests per day. A study examined 1070 samples from 205 Wuhan patients and reported varied sensitivity according to the methods and location of sample collection. Samples from bronchoalveolar lavage fluid specimens returned the highest sensitivity. The authors argued that CT scans showed even higher sensitivity.

US commercial labs began testing in early March. As of the 5th, LabCorp announced nationwide availability of COVID-19 testing based on RT-PCR. Quest Diagnostics made nationwide testing available as of 9 March. US testing demand grew rapidly, causing backlogs of hundreds of thousands of tests at private US labs. Supplies of swabs and chemical reagents continued strained. On 25 May, the US required each state to take responsibility for meeting its testing needs. In March, the FDA issued EUAs for nucleic acid tests to Hologic (3/16), Abbott Laboratories (3/18), Thermo Fisher Scientific (3/19) Cepheid (3/21) and LabCorp (4/30).

On 12 March, Mayo Clinic announced a nucleic acid test.

On 16 March, the WHO called for ramping up testing programmes as the best way to slow the spread. Several European countries initially conducted more tests than the US. By 19 March, drive-in tests were offered in several large cities.

As of 22 March, according to the president of the Robert Koch Institute, Germany had capacity for 160,000 tests per week. As of 26 March, German Health Minister Jens Spahn estimated that Germany was conducting 200,000 tests per week. Germany has a large medical diagnostics industry, with more than a hundred testing labs that provided the technology and infrastructure to enable rapid increases in testing. Costs are borne by insurance when the test is ordered by a physician. As of the end of March at least 483,295 samples were tested and 33,491 (6.9%) had tested positive.

On 26 March, it was reported that 80% of test kits that Czechia purchased from China gave inaccurate results. Slovakia purchased 1.2 million antibody-based test kits from China that were found to be inaccurate. China accused Czechia and Slovakia of incorrect use of those tests. Ateş Kara of the Turkish Health Ministry said the test kits Turkey purchased from China had a "high error rate".

Spain purchased test kits from Chinese firm Shenzhen Bioeasy Biotechnology Co Ltd, but found that results were unacceptable. The maker explained that the incorrect results may stem from failure to collect samples or use the kits correctly. On 27 March, the Spanish ministry switched to another vendor, Shenzhen Bioeasy.

By 31 March, the United Arab Emirates was testing more of its population per head than any other country. UAE implemented a combination of drive-through sample collection, and a mass-throughput laboratory from Group 42 and BGI. The lab conduced tens of thousands RT-PCR tests per day and was the first to be operational at that scale other than China.

By the month's end, testing had surpassed 200k/week.

=== April ===
The FDA gave an EUA for the US' first antibody test on the 2nd.

On 5 April, the U.S. subsidiary of China's BGI Group sent a proposal to the state of California offering to build in California, at cost ($10 million), the world's largest COVID-19 testing site, in two weeks, and train Americans to operate it. California's consultants recommended against it, because of the risk of security and commercial competition.

As of 7 April, the World Health Organization (WHO) had accepted two diagnostic tests for procurement under the Emergency Use Listing procedure (EUL).

On 13 April, Health Canada approved a nucleic acid test from Spartan Bioscience. Institutions may "test patients" with a handheld DNA analyzer "and receive results without having to send samples away to a [central] lab".

By the start of April, the United Kingdom was delivering around 10,000 swab tests per day. The British NHS announced that it was piloting a scheme to test suspected cases at home, to remove the risk of one patient infecting others at a hospital or disinfecting an ambulance used to transport a patient.

The UK purchased 3.5 million antibody test kits from China, but in early April 2020 announced these were not usable. On 21 April 2020, the Indian Council of Medical Research (ICMR) advised Indian states to stop using test kits purchased from China after receiving complaints from one state. Rajasthan health minister Raghu Sharma on 21 April said the kits gave only 5.4 percent accurate results.

Antibody survey results found from 2% to 30% positive. On preliminary data, WHO concluded that 2% to 3% of the world population had developed antibodies.

By month end, testing had surpassed 750k/week.

=== May ===
A video compilation of free testing sites in California.

In May antibody tests were conducted on 5,603 major league baseball employees and 0.7% tested positive, showing that they had been infected. 70% of those who tested positive had had no symptoms. The US was conducting an average of 2.5 million tests per week for the week ending 17 May. This grew to 3.2 million by 14 June.

Attempts to culture virus from upper respiratory specimens were largely unsuccessful when viral burden is low but detectable (i.e., cycle threshold values higher than 33–35).

On 1 May, Quotient Limited announced the CE Mark for its MosaiQ COVID-19 antibody test, designed as a serological disease screen specific to the Coronavirus. The test has a 100% sensitivity and 99,8% specificity claim.

On 3 May, Roche received an EUA for a selective ELISA serology test.

On 8 May, the FDA granted its first EUA for antigen test: "Sofia 2 SARS Antigen FIA" by Quidel Corp.

The FDA announced on 14 May a review of 15 adverse event reports about the Abbott ID Now device for low sensitivity.

On 21 May, researchers at Ben-Gurion University in Israel reported a one-minute coronavirus test with 90% accuracy, based on the "change in the resonance in the THz spectral range" shown by the coronavirus through THz spectroscopy.

Nearly two million antibody tests imported into Australia and costing $20 million were declared unusable.

In early May Harvard's Global Health Institute estimated that the US needed to test more than 900k per day. Other recommendations ranged up to 23m per day.

As of 24 May, countries that publicised their testing data had typically performed tests equal to 2.6 percent of their population percent of their population, although no country had tested more than 17.3%.

On 29 May Siemens received an EUA for its anti-spike RBD-targeting serology test that it believes detects neutralizing antibodies.

By month end, testing had surpassed 1.4m/week.

=== June ===
In June, researchers announced a nucleic acid diagnostic test using reverse transcription-loop-mediated isothermal amplification (RT-LAMP), an existing technology used in pathogenic microorganism identification, genetically modified ingredients, tumor detection, and embryo sex identification. The test identified virus in samples of serum, urine, saliva, oropharyngeal swabs and nasopharyngeal swabs. Once commercialized the test has the potential to provide rapid (30-45 minute) diagnosis at point of care. The test was 100% selective and highly sensitive, detecting virus at a concentration of .06 fg/ml.

As of 14 June 2020, the percentage testing positive in the US as a whole had fallen below 5%. As of late June, test numbers crossed 600k/day.

=== November ===
On 6 November, the U.S. Food and Drug Administration (FDA) authorized the first serology test that detects neutralizing antibodies from recent or prior SARS-CoV-2 infection, which are antibodies that bind to a specific part of a pathogen and have been observed in a laboratory setting to decrease SARS-CoV-2 viral infection of cells. The FDA issued an emergency use authorization (EUA) for the cPass SARS-CoV-2 Neutralization Antibody Detection Kit, which specifically detects this type of antibody. The FDA granted Lucira Health emergency use authorization for the first US at-home rapid molecular diagnostic test. With a prescription from a healthcare provider, consumers can use the test kit to take a nasal swab then perform a 30-minute SARS-CoV-2 detection test at home.

=== December ===
On 15 December, the U.S. Food and Drug Administration (FDA) issued an emergency use authorization (EUA) for the first over-the-counter (OTC) fully at-home diagnostic test for COVID-19. The 'Ellume COVID-19 Home Test' is a rapid, lateral flow antigen test, a type of test that runs a liquid sample along a surface with reactive molecules. The test detects fragments of proteins of the SARS-CoV-2 virus from a nasal swab sample from any individual two years of age or older. The Ellume test uses a mid-turbinate nasal swab (sample is collected further back than the usual nasal swab, but not as far back as nasopharyngeal swabs, which are only appropriate for use by a trained health care provider) to detect certain proteins of the virus known as antigens. The Ellume test uses an analyzer that connects via bluetooth with a software application on a smartphone to help users perform the test and interpret results. Results are delivered in as little as 20 minutes to individuals via their smartphone.

== 2021 ==
=== July ===
On July 21, the U.S. CDC announced that, after December 31, 2021, it "will withdraw the request to the U.S. Food and Drug Administration (FDA) for Emergency Use Authorization (EUA) of the CDC 2019-Novel Coronavirus (2019-nCoV) Real-Time RT-PCR Diagnostic Panel" and that the CDC encourages "laboratories to consider adoption of a multiplexed method that can facilitate detection and differentiation of SARS-CoV-2 and influenza viruses."

== See also ==
- COVID-19 testing
- COVID-19 rapid antigen test
