= SNPlex =

Proprietary method for detecting variations in single DNA nucleotides

SNPlex is a platform for SNP genotyping sold by Applied Biosystems (ABI). It is based on capillary electrophoresis to separate varying fragments of DNA, which allows the assay to be performed on ABI's 3730xl DNA analyzers. Currently, up to 48 SNPs can be genotyped in a single reaction.
