= Tracking stock =

Special equity offering by a diversified company that tracks a subset of its operations

Tracking stock (also known as letter stock and targeted stock) is a specialized equity offering issued by a company that is based on the operations of a defined business within the larger organization (such as, for instance, a wholly owned subsidiary of a diversified firm). Therefore, the tracking stock will be traded at a price related to the operations of the specific division of the company being "tracked". Tracking stock is typically limited, or has no voting rights. Often, tracking stock is issued to separate a high-growth (but initially, unprofitable) division from its parent company, while the parent company and its shareholders remain in control of the subsidiary's operations.

A tracking stock is issued from a corporation’s voting common stock as a special class of stock specifically tied to the financial performance of any type of definable business division, including a subsidiary, product line, or geographical territory. Stockholder benefits are confined to that division's earnings, and not to the larger company's overall performance. A parent company will retain a consolidated balance sheet and one board of directors, but issue separate income statements for its common stock and for its tracking stock. Reasons for issuing tracking stock may include attracting capital for atypical mergers and acquisitions, or increasing stock options for key executives.

== Examples ==
During the dot-com bubble, some companies that predated the bubble identified their Internet operations as high-growth divisions that would benefit from a tracking stock. The best-known example is The Walt Disney Company, which issued a tracking stock for go.com. At around the same time the bubble ended, Disney retired the tracking stock. AT&T (AWE) and Sprint Corporation (PCS) also established tracking stocks for their cellular telephone operations, but neither of these tracking stocks is still outstanding.

Applera was the successor company to what was previously the Life Sciences Division of PerkinElmer Corporation. Applera was not publicly traded, but instead it consisted of two major groups which were publicly traded tracking stocks in the proteomics industrial sector. These two groups, formed in 1999, were the S&P 500 listed Applera Corp-Applied Biosystems Group and Applera Corp-Celera Corporation Genomics Group. The two entities shared corporate functions and intellectual property. They also shifted products as their separate strategies changed. For instance, in 2002, marketing and sales of the human genome database developed by Celera was transferred to Applied Biosystems, which had a more appropriate sales structure to monetize the database. This allowed Celera to focus on new pharmaceutical initiatives. The two entities did not have separate boards, so the Applera board had to balance the interests of the separate shareholders. In 2008, Applera spun off Celera into an independent company, after which Applera changed its name to Applied Biosystems. A merger between Applied Biosystems and Invitrogen was then finalized in 2008, creating Life Technologies. Celera was acquired by Quest Diagnostics in 2011, and Life Technologies was acquired by Thermo Fisher Scientific in 2014.

Among other examples, in 1999 Quantum Corp. issued tracking stock in two subsidiaries: its DLT and Storage Systems Group (DSS) and its Hard Disk Drive Group (HDD). Two years later, in 2001, Quantum sold the Hard Disk Drive business to Maxtor and redeemed the HDD tracking stock.

Qurate Retail Group (Nasdaq: QRTEA and QRTEB after March 18, 2018 symbol changes from QVCA and QVCB) had tracking stocks for Liberty Entertainment—formerly LMDIA and LMDIB on Nasdaq, Liberty Capital—formerly LCAPA and LCAPB on Nasdaq, Liberty Starz—formerly LSTZA and LSTZB on Nasdaq, and Liberty Ventures (LVG)—formerly LVNTA and LVNTB on the Nasdaq) at various times since going public. However, on September 23, 2011, Liberty Interactive—formerly LINTA and LINTB on Nasdaq—spun off Liberty Media (Liberty) as a separate company. Therefore, no major U.S. companies had tracking stocks until August 9, 2012, when Liberty Interactive issued tracking stock for itself (LINTA/B) and LVG (LVNTA/B). LVG's tracking stock was fully-redeemed and retired after QVC Group split-off GCI Liberty on March 9, 2018.

Post separation from Qurate, Liberty (Nasdaq: FWONA and FWONK and OTCQB: FWONB after January 23, 2017 symbol changes from LMCA, LMCB, and LMCK) has issued tracking stocks for Liberty Live Group (LLG) (Nasdaq: LLYVA and LLYVK and OTCQB: LLYVB), Liberty SiriusXM Group (LSG)—formerly LSXMA, LSXMB, and LSXMK on the Nasdaq, and Atlanta Braves Holdings (ABH) (Nasdaq: BATRA and BATRK and OTCQB: BATRB) at various times since going public. In April 2016, Liberty reclassified its common stock into tracking stocks for itself (LMCA/B/K), Liberty Braves Group (LBG) (BATRA/B/K), and LSG (LSXMA/B/K). It spun off LBG as ABH under the same symbols on July 18, 2023, leaving only Liberty Formula One (LF1) and LSG. Liberty added LLG's tracking stock (LLYVA/B/K) on August 4, 2023. On 9 September 2024, Liberty merged LSG into the then-stub of SiriusXM Holdings Inc. (SXHI) to form a new independent SXHI, which continued using the symbol SIRI on the Nasdaq a day later. It spun off LLG as Liberty Live Holdings on December 15, 2025 under the extant symbols, thereby leaving no major U.S. companies with tracking stocks. During that process, LF1 reclassified its own shares into those of Formula One Group.

== See also ==
- Dual-listed company
