= Applied Biosystems =

Brand of Thermo Fisher Scientific corporation

- Successor: Life Technologies
- Headquarters: Waltham, Massachusetts, USA
- Key people: Marc N. Casper (President & CEO)
- Website: www.thermofisher.com

Applied Biosystems is one of various brands under the Life Technologies brand of Thermo Fisher Scientific corporation. The brand is focused on integrated systems for genetic analysis, which include computerized machines and the consumables used within them (such as reagents).

In 2008, a merger between Applied Biosystems and Invitrogen was finalized, creating Life Technologies. The latter was acquired by Thermo Fisher Scientific in 2014. Prior to 2008, the Applied Biosystems brand was owned by various entities in a corporate group parented by PerkinElmer. The roots of Applied Biosystems trace back to GeneCo (Genetic Systems Company), a pioneer biotechnology company founded in 1981 in Foster City, California. Through the 1980s and early 1990s, Applied Biosystems, Inc. operated independently and manufactured biochemicals and automated genetic engineering and diagnostic research instruments, including the principal brand of DNA sequencing machine used by the Human Genome Project consortium centers. Applied Biosystems' close ties to the consortium project led to the idea for the founding of Celera Genomics in 1998 as one of several independent competitors to the consortium.

In 1993 Applied Biosystems, Inc., was delisted from the NASDAQ when it was acquired by the old company known then as Perkin-Elmer. As the PE Applied Biosystems Division under that parent in 1998, it became consolidated with other acquisitions as the primary PE Biosystems Division. In 1999 its parent company reorganized and changed its name to PE Corporation, and the PE Biosystems Group (formerly again became publicly traded, as a tracking stock of its parent, along with its sister tracking stock company, Celera Genomics. In 2000 the parent became Applera Corporation. The Applied Biosystems name also returned that year, in the name change of the tracking stock from PE Biosystems Group to Applera Corporation-Applied Biosystems Group, an S&P 500 company, which remains as a publicly traded operating group within Applera Corp., along with its sibling operating group, Applera Corporation-Celera Group. Applera derives its name from the combination of its two component groups' names, Appl^{(iedCel)}era In November 2008, a merger between Applied Biosystems and Invitrogen was finalized "creating a global leader in biotechnology reagents and systems". The new company was called Life Technologies.

== History ==
Company History
Year	Company name
1981	Genetic Systems Company (GeneCo)
1982	Applied Biosystems, Inc. (ABI)
1993	Applied Biosystems, Perkin-Elmer
1996	PE Applied Biosystems
1998	PE Biosystems
2000	Applied Biosystems Group, Applera Corp
2002	Applied Biosystems
2008	Life Technologies
2014	Thermo Fisher Scientific

In 1981, the company was founded by two scientist/engineers from Hewlett Packard, Sam Eletr and André Marion based on technology developed by Leroy Hood and Marvin H. Caruthers.

In 1982, Applied Biosystems released its first commercial instrument, the Model 470A Protein Sequencer. The machine enabled scientists to determine the order of amino acids within a purified protein, which in turn correlated with the protein's function. With 40 employees, the company, reported first-time revenue of US$402,000.

In 1983, the company was led by its president and Chairman of the Board, Sam Eletr and Chief Operating Officer Andre Marion, the company doubled its number of employees to 80, and its stock went public on the NASDAQ exchange under the symbol ABIO, with revenues of US$5.9 million. A new product was a fluorescent molecular tag for immunodiagnostic assays.

The company released its second commercial instrument, the Model 380A DNA Synthesizer, which made oligonucleotides, short DNA strands, for polymerase chain reaction (PCR), DNA sequencing, and gene identification. The two sequencer and synthesizer products allowed molecular biologists to clone genes by building oligonucleotides with the desired protein's DNA sequence.

Automated DNA sequencing began at the California Institute of Technology, using fluorescent dyes, with Rights to the technology granted to Applied Biosystems. At CIT, Dr. Leroy Hood and Dr. Lloyd Smith, together pioneered those first DNA sequencing machines.

In 1984, Applied Biosystems sales revenue tripled to over US$18 million, with a second yearly profit, and with over 200 employees. Services included synthesizing custom DNA and protein fragments, and the sequencing of protein samples submitted from customers. The third major instrument made by Applied, the Model 430A Peptide Synthesizer, was introduced.

In 1985, Applied Biosystems sales revenue grew nearly 70% to over US$35 million, with a third yearly profit. Two new products included the Model 380B DNA Synthesizer and the 381A DNA Synthesizer. That year the company went international for the first time, when it established a wholly owned subsidiary in Great Britain to save shipping costs on chemical sales, which overall by then accounted for 17% of sales.

Also in 1985, Applied Biosystems acquired Brownlee Labs, a manufacturer of columns and pumps for high-performance liquid chromatography (HPLC) systems, after its founder, Robert Brownlee was diagnosed with AIDS-related complex in 1984. Brownlee's technology brought the new on-line 120A PTH Amino Acid Analyzer.

However, Brownlee then began a new company, which was viewed by Applied as a competitor. In 1989 Applied and Brownlee settled in a lawsuit over the conflict. As late as 1990, Brownlee publicly discussed what had been his contributions in the rocky relationship with Applied, before he died early the next year.

In 1986, Andre Marion became president and chief executive officer. Sales revenue increased by 45% to nearly US$52 million. The company introduced six new products, totalling eleven automated instruments. The release of the Model 370A DNA Sequencing System, using fluorescent tags, revolutionized gene discovery. The Model 340A Nucleic Acid Extractor became used in medical labs to isolate DNA from bacteria, blood, and tissue.

In 1987, Sam Eletr resigned for health reasons. Revenues increase by 63% to nearly US$85 million, with 788 employees, and another six new instruments. Applied Biosystems acquired the Kratos Division of Spectros International PLC.

By 1988, the product line had increased to over 25 different automated instruments, over 400 liquid chromatography columns and components, and about 320 chemicals, biochemicals, and consumables. Sales revenue grew to over US$132 million, with almost 1000 employees in eight countries. In that year for the first time, genetic science reached the milestone of being able to identify individuals by their DNA.

In 1989, sales revenue reached nearly $160 million. Applied Biosystems maintained 15 offices in 9 different countries, and introduced four new products. The company developed enzyme-based reagent kits made by Promega Corporation, and in the new field of bioinformatics, licensed with TRW Inc. Also, joint marketing began with Perkin-Elmer Corporation and Cetus Corporation (formerly of instruments and reagents for DNA replication, the fastest growing segment in biotechnology.

In 1990, instrument sales underwent a cyclical slowdown, as the economy entered the 1990–91 recession. For the first year, Applied revenues did not grow, and came in at less than $159 million, with 1,334 employees. New company developments included new instrumentation for robotics and detection of DNA fragments using the company's fluorescent labelling.

Also in 1990, the U.S. government approved financing to support the Human Genome Project. Dr. James D. Watson, who founded the consortium, forecast that the project could be completed in 15 years from its 1990 starting date, at a cost of cost US$3 billion. Over the next couple years, Japan began a project to sequence the rice genome, and other laboratories initiated programs to sequence the mouse, fruit fly, and yeast genomes.

In 1991, Applied sales revenue grew slightly, to almost $164 million, with consumables and service contracts up by 24% to account for 47% of total sales, and DNA sequencer and DNA synthesis instruments having record sales. Forty-five new consumable products and six new instruments were introduced.

In 1992, sales revenue grew by more than 11% to over $182 million, with Europe representing 25% of revenue, and Asia and the Pacific Rim accounting for 26%. The company formed a new subsidiary, Lynx Therapeutics, Inc., to focus on antisense DNA research in the area of therapeutics for chronic myelogenous leukemia, melanoma, colorectal cancer, and AIDS.

=== Perkin-Elmer ===
In February 1993 Applied Biosystems was acquired by Perkin-Elmer, and became the Applied Biosystems Division, as part of the Life Sciences markets segment of that company. Andre Marion, who had been Applied Biosystems's Chairman, president and CEO, became a Senior Vice President of Perkin-Elmer, and President of the Applied Biosystems Division. That year the company was the world's leading manufacturer of instruments and reagents for polymerase chain reaction (PCR). It marketed PCR reagents kits in alliance with Hoffman-La Roche Inc.

In 1994, Perkin-Elmer reported net revenues of over $1 billion, of which Life Sciences accounted for 42% of the business. The company has 5,954 employees. A brand-new highly competitive genomics industry had formed for the development of new pharmaceuticals, based on the work of the Human Genome Project. Companies such as Sequana Therapeutics in San Diego, Human Genome Sciences in Maryland, Myriad Genetics in Utah, INCYTE Pharmaceuticals (later Incyte Genomics) in California, and Millennium Pharmaceuticals relied on the Applied Biosystems Division, which made thermal cyclers and automated sequencers for these new genomics companies.

In 1995, upon Andre Marion retirement, Mike Hunkapiller became President of PE Applied Biosystems Division which sold its 30,000th thermal cycler. To meet Human Genome Project goals, Perkin-Elmer developed mapping kits with markers every 10 million bases along each chromosome. Also that year, DNA fingerprinting using PCR became accepted in court as reliable forensic evidence.

In 1996, Perkin-Elmer acquired Tropix, Inc., a chemiluminescence company, for its life sciences division.

=== PE Applied Biosystems ===
In September 1995, Tony L. White from Baxter International Inc. became president and chief executive officer of Perkin-Elmer. In 1996 the company was reorganized into two separate operating divisions, Analytical Instruments and PE Applied Biosystems. The PE Applied Biosystems division accounted for half of Perkin-Elmer's total revenue, with net revenues up by 26%.

In 1997, revenues reached almost US$1.3 billion, of which PE Applied Biosystems was US$653 million. The company acquired GenScope, Inc., and Linkage Genetics, Inc. The Linkage Genetics unit was combined with Zoogen to form PE AgGen, focused on genetic analysis services for plant and animal breeding. The PE Applied Biosystems division partnered with Hyseq, Inc., for work on the new DNA chip technology, and also worked with Tecan U.S., Inc., on combinatorial chemistry automation systems, and also with Molecular Informatics, Inc. on genetic data management and analysis automated systems.

=== PE Biosystems ===
In 1998, PE Applied Biosystems became PE Biosystems, and the division's revenues reached US$921.8 million. In January 1998 Perkin-Elmer acquired PerSeptive Biosystems (formerly of Framingham, Massachusetts. It was a leader in the bio-instrumentation field where it made biomolecule purification systems for protein analysis. Noubar Afeyan, Ph.D., had been the founder, chairman, and CEO of PerSeptive, and with the Perkin-Elmer successor company he set up the later tracking stock for Celera.

In 1998, Perkin-Elmer formed the PE Biosystems division, by consolidating Applied Biosystems, PerSeptive Biosystems, Tropix and PE Informatics. Informatics was formed from the Perkin-Elmer combination of two other acquisitions, Molecular Informatics and Nelson Analytical Systems, with existing units of Perkin-Elmer.

While planning the next new generation of machines, PE Biosystems' president, Michael W. Hunkapiller, calculated that it would be possible for their own private industry to decode the human genome before the academic consortium could complete it, by using the resources of a single, industrial-scale center, even though it would require starting from scratch. It was a bold prediction, given that the consortium target date set by Dr. Watson back in 1990 had been the forward year of 2005, only seven years away, and with the consortium already half the way to the completion target date.

Also, it meant that Dr. Hunkapiller's idea would require competing against his own customers, to all of whom Applied Biosystems sold its sequencing machines and their chemical reagents. However, he calculated that it would also mean doubling the market for that equipment.

Hunkapiller brought in Dr. J. Craig Venter to direct the project. Tony White, president of the Perkin-Elmer Corporation backed Hunkapiller on the venture. They organized the new company to accomplish the task. In May 1998, Celera Genomics was formed, to rapidly accelerate the human DNA sequencing process. Dr. Venter boldly declared to the media that he would complete the genome decoding by 2001. That bold announcement prompted the academic consortium to accelerate their own deadline by a couple years, to 2003.

Also in 1998, PE Biosystems partnered with Hitachi, Ltd. to develop electrophoresis-based genetic analysis systems, which resulted in their chief new genomics instrument, the ABI PRISM 3700 DNA Analyzer, which advanced the Human Genome sequencing project by nearly five years ahead of schedule. The partnerships sold hundreds of the 3700 analyzers to Celera, and also to others worldwide.

The new machine cost US$300,000 each, but was a major leap beyond its predecessor, the 377, and was fully automated, allowing genetic decoding to run around the clock with little supervision. According to Venter, the machine was so revolutionary that it could decode in a single day the same amount of genetic material that most DNA labs could produce in a year.

The public consortium also bought one of the PE Biosystems 3700 sequencers, and had plans to buy 200 more. The machine proved to be so fast that by late March 1999 the consortium announced that it had revised its timeline, and would release by the Spring of 2000 a "first draft sequence" for 80% of the human genome.

At year end 1998, the PE Biosystems Group's sales reached US$940 million.

=== PE Corporation ===
In 1999, to focus on the new genomics, Perkin-Elmer Corporation was renamed PE Corporation, and sold its old Analytical Instruments division to EG&G, Inc., which also acquired the Perkin-Elmer name. PE Biosystems remained with PE Corp., and became PE Biosystems Group, with 3,500 employees and net revenues of over $1.2 billion. New instruments were developed and sold for forensic human identification, protein identification and characterization, metabolite pathway identification, and lead compound identification from combinatorial libraries.

On April 27, 1999, the shareholders of Perkin-Elmer Corporation approved the reorganization of Perkin-Elmer into PE Corporation, a pure-play life science company. Each share of the Perkin-Elmer stock (PKN) was to be exchanged for one share and for 1/2 of a share respectively of the two new common share tracking stocks for the two component Life Sciences groups, PE Biosystems Group and Celera Genomics Group.

On April 28, 1999, the two replacement tracking stocks for the new PE Corporation were issued to shareholders. Dr. Michael W. Hunkapiller remained as a Senior Vice President of PE Corporation, and as president of PE Biosystems.

On May 6, 1999, the recapitalization of the company resulted in issuance of the two new classes of common stock, called PE Corporation-PE Biosystems Group Common Stock and PE Corporation-Celera Genomics Group Common Stock. On that date, trading began in both new stocks on the New York Stock Exchange, to great excitement.

On June 17, 1999, the Board of PE Corporation announced a two-for-one split of PE Biosystems Group Common Stock.

By June 2000, the genomics segment of the technology bubble was peaking. Celera Genomics (CRA) and PE Biosystems (PEB) were among five genetics pioneers leading at that time, along with Incyte Genomics, Human Genome Sciences, and Millennium Pharmaceuticals. All five of those stocks by then had exceeded a price above $100 per share in the market, before ultimately crashing back down.

=== Applera ===
On November 30, 2000, PE Corporation changed its name to Applera, combining the two partial names Applied and Celera into one, with 5,000 employees. PE Biosystems Group was renamed once again to Applied Biosystems Group, and changed its ticker symbol from PEB to ABI. Its net revenues rose to almost US$1.4 billion. Celera that year made milestone headlines when it announced that it had completed the sequencing and first assembly of the two largest genomes in history, that of the fruit fly, and of the human.

In 2001, the Applied Biosystems division of Applera reached revenues of US$1.6 billion, and developed a new workstation instrument specifically for the new field of proteomics, which had become Celera's new core business focus, as it shifted away from gene discovery. The instrument analyzed 1,000 protein samples per hour.

On April 22, 2002, the Celera Genomics Group announced its decision to shift the role of marketing data from its genetic database over to its sister company, the Applied Biosystems Group. Celera would instead develop pharmaceutical drugs. Applied Biosystems was a better fit for the database, because Applied already had the huge sales force in place for the marketing of its instruments. Plans were to expand those sales and those of the database into an electronic commerce system.

In 2002, Applied Biosystems reached revenues of US$1.6 billion for the year, and took control from Celera of the support of Celera Discovery System (CDS), a data tool to answer specific genomic and proteomic queries, involving the new genetic data field of tens of thousands of single-nucleotide polymorphisms (SNPs) within the human genome. The company developed another new tool, which combined the first ever union of triple quadrupole and ion trap technologies, in proteomics research.

The database itself would remain with Celera, because of shareholder approval complications. Celera would retain responsibility for its maintenance and support to existing customers, and would receive royalties from Applied Biosystems.

In 2003, Catherine Burzik joined Applied's management, from Ortho-Clinical Diagnostics. Applied developed a new tool which measured antibody/antigen binding in real-time kinetic analysis of up to 400 binding interactions simultaneously.

In 2004, Mike Hunkapiller retired and Cathy Burzik replaced him as President of Applied Biosystems. Applera collaborated with General Electric, Abbott Laboratories, Seattle Genetics, and Merck in diagnostics development. Applied Biosystmes also teamed with Northrop Grumman and Cepheid of Sunnyvale, California, to detect Bacillus anthracis during the anthrax contamination case of the U.S. Postal Service.

In 2005, the company released new tools for small molecule quantitation in pharmaceutical drug development. In Mexico, Applied Biosystems collaborated with the National Institute of Genomic Medicine of Mexico (Instituto Nacional de Medicina Genomica or INMEGEN), and established an Applied Biosystems Sequencing and Genotyping Unit at INMEGEN.

In 2006, Applied Biosystems acquired the Research Products Division of Ambion, a supplier of RNA-based reagents and products. That year, with the Influenza A Subtype H5N1 "avian flu" strain scare, the company launched a global initiative to identify and track such infectious diseases.

In 2006, Applied Biosystems also acquired Agencourt Personal Genomics, located in Beverly, MA, to commercialize Agencourt's SOLiD sequencing system.

In 2007, ABI Solid Sequencing, a next-gen DNA sequencing platform, was announced. Mark Stevenson was appointed president and chief operating officer of Applied Biosystems.

In November 2008, Applied Biosystems merged with Invitrogen, forming Life Technologies, which was acquired by Thermo Fisher Scientific in 2014.

== See also ==
- 2 Base Encoding
- ABI Solid Sequencing
- Next-generation sequencing
- Illumina (company)
- 454 Life Sciences
