= RiboGreen =

Fluorescent dye

RiboGreen is a proprietary fluorescent dye that is used in the detection and quantification of nucleic acids, including both RNA and DNA. It is synthesized and marketed by Molecular Probes/Invitrogen (a division of Life Technologies, now part of Thermo Fisher Scientific) of Eugene, Oregon, United States. In its free form, RiboGreen exhibits little fluorescence and possesses a negligible absorbance signature. When bound to nucleic acids, the dye fluoresces with an intensity that, according to the manufacturer, is several orders of magnitude greater than the unbound form. The fluorescence can be detected by a sensor and the nucleic acid can be quantified. The presence of protein contaminants in the sample of nucleic acids to be tested does not make significant contributions to the absorbance, and thus allows for the addition of deoxyribonucleases to the protocol in order to degrade DNA, in the instances where one is only interested in detecting or quantifying RNA.
