= Mahendra Rao =

Indian medical researcher

Mahendra Rao is a researcher known for his work involving human embryonic stem cells and other somatic stem cells. In 2011, Rao was appointed Director of the National Institutes of Health Center for Regenerative Medicine.

== Biography ==
Rao received his MBBS from Bombay University, and then earned a PhD in developmental neurobiology from California Institute of Technology.

After postdoctoral work at Case Western Reserve, he became an independent researcher at University of Utah. Next he joined the National Institute of Aging, where he studied neural progenitor cells and their potential clinical use. Rao was also the VP of Regenerative Medicine at Life Technologies. Additionally, he co-founded Q Therapeutics, a stem-cell research firm and serves on USDA Cellular Tissue and Gene Therapies advisory committee and more.

Rao also holds a joint research appointment in NIAMS and NINDS.

== Recent Publications ==
- Liu, Ying; Rao, Mahendra (2011). "Gene Targeting in Human Pluripotent Stem Cells". Human Pluripotent Stem Cells. Methods in Molecular Biology. Vol. 767. pp. 355–67. doi:10.1007/978-1-61779-201-4_26. ISBN 978-1-61779-200-7. PMID 21822888.
- Chiu, Arlene Y.; Rao, Mahendra S. (2011). "Cell-Based Therapy for Neural Disorders — Anticipating Challenges". Neurotherapeutics. 8 (4): 744–52. doi:10.1007/s13311-011-0066-9. PMC 3250286. PMID 21901585.
- Rao, Mahendra S. (2011). "Funding Translational Work in Cell-Based Therapy". Cell Stem Cell. 9 (1): 7–10. doi:10.1016/j.stem.2011.06.009. PMID 21726828.
- Vemuri, Mohan C.; Chase, Lucas G.; Rao, Mahendra S. (2011). Mesenchymal Stem Cell Assays and Applications. Methods in Molecular Biology. Vol. 698. pp. 3–8. doi:10.1007/978-1-60761-999-4_1. ISBN 978-1-60761-998-7. PMID 21431506.
