= Celera Corporation =

American genetic sequencing company

- Type: Subsidiary
- Traded as: Nasdaq: CRA
- Industry: Technology
- Founded: 1998; 28 years ago
- Headquarters: Alameda, California, United States
- Key people: William G. Green (chairman); Kathy P Ordonez (president)
- Products: Scientific & Technical Instruments
- Number of employees: 554
- Parent: Quest Diagnostics
- Website: www.celera.com

Celera Corporation is a subsidiary of Quest Diagnostics which focuses on genetic sequencing and related technologies. It was founded in 1998 as a business unit of Applera, spun off into an independent company in 2008, and finally acquired by Quest Diagnostics in 2011.

== History ==
Originally headquartered in Rockville, Maryland (relocated to Alameda, California), it was established in May 1998 by PE Corporation (later renamed to Applera), with Dr. J. Craig Venter from The Institute for Genomic Research (TIGR) as its first president. While at TIGR, Venter and Hamilton Smith led the first successful effort to sequence an entire organism's genome, that of the Haemophilus influenzae bacterium. Celera was formed for the purpose of generating and commercializing genomic information. Its stock is a tracking stock of Applera, along with the tracking stock of Applera's larger Applied Biosystems Group business unit.

Celera sequenced the human genome at a fraction of the cost of the publicly funded Human Genome Project (HGP), using about $300 million of private funding versus approximately $3 billion of taxpayer dollars. However, a significant portion of the human genome had already been sequenced when Celera entered the field, and thus Celera did not incur any costs with obtaining the existing data, which was freely available to the public from GenBank. Celera's approach, which used shotgun sequencing, spurred the public HGP to accelerate its effort and shift its projected timetable from 2005 to 2003.

Critics of initial efforts by Celera Genomics to hold back data from sections of genome they sequenced for commercial exploitation felt that it would retard progress in science as a whole. These critics pointed to the open access policy for gene sequences from the publicly funded Human Genome Project. Later, the company changed their policy and made their sequences available for non-commercial use but set a maximum threshold for amount of sequence data that a researcher could download at any given time.

The rise and fall of Celera as an ambitious competitor of the Human Genome Project is the main subject of the book The Genome War by James Shreeve, who followed Venter around for two years in the process of writing the book. A view from the public effort's side is that of Nobel laureate Sir John Sulston in his book The Common Thread: A Story of Science, Politics, Ethics and the Human Genome. Anthropologist Paul Rabinow also based his 2005 book A Machine to Make a Future on Celera.

== Genomes sequenced by Celera Genomics ==
Eukaryotes:

- Drosophila melanogaster (fruit fly)
- Human, specifically mostly that of Craig Venter
- Anopheles gambiae (mosquito)
- Mouse
