= Robert Brownlee =

American chemist

Robert Gregg Brownlee (October 21, 1942 – February 27, 1991) was an American chemist.

== Biography ==
Robert Brownlee was born October 21, 1942, in South Dakota. He founded Brownlee Labs in the 1970s, in the San Francisco Bay area, a manufacturer of columns and pumps for high-performance liquid chromatography systems.

Bob Brownlee took the initiative "along with Tom Jupille, Steve Bakalyar, Nelson Cooke, Jerry Higgins and Ron Majors" to form the Bay Area Chromatography Colloquium. Bob Stevenson is quoted as saying in his Nine Lives of the California Separation Science Society that Brownlee Labs was "certainly one of the globe's leaders in HPLC column technology."

In the 1980s, when Robert Brownlee was diagnosed with AIDS-related complex, he sold his company to Applied Biosystems of Foster City, California, in 1984. (Applied later merged with Perkin-Elmer).

Sometime later, he began a new company, which was viewed by Applied as a competitor. A lawsuit was instituted and later settled (Brownlee v. Applied Biosystems, Inc., 1989-1 Trade Cas. (CCH) ¶ 68, (N.D. Cal. 1989) 8,14).

In 1990, he was interviewed for an article in The Scientist about Applied Biosystems. "If you produce the first product for these virgins [scientists without such equipment], you have a big value added, and you can charge a big price for your product," Brownlee says. "That's the reason Applied Biosystems did so well."

He also formed the Robert Brownlee Foundation, a private family foundation which supports, with grants, K–12 science. In addition, the contributions of his foundation made possible a project introducing children to marine sciences, aboard the 90-foot research vessel the Robert G. Brownlee, built in 1998 and run by the Marine Science Institute (San Francisco Bay) of Redwood City, California.

He died on February 27, 1991, of AIDS.

== Works ==
- Simulated distillation of high-boiling petroleum fractions by capillary supercritical fluid chromatography and vacuum thermal gravimetric analysis, with Herbert E. Schwartz, Mieczyslaw M. Boduszynski, and Fu Su in Analytical Chemistry (journal), May 15, 1987

== Resources ==
- Casss Times, Spring 2005
- Casss Times, Autumn 2005
- California Death Index
- Robert G Brownlee Marine project
- Article in The Scientist, June 1990
- Applied Biosystems Timeline
