= Marine Science Institute (San Francisco Bay) =

US nonprofit organization

- Marine Science Institute Logo
- Motto: Discovering Our Bay
- Established: 1970; 56 years ago
- Focus: Marine Education
- Chair: James Crawford
- Executive Director: Marilou Seiff
- Budget: US$1,775,000
- Address: 500 Discovery Parkway, Redwood City, CA 94063
- Location: Redwood City, California, US
- Coordinates: 37°30′17″N 122°13′02″W
- Interactive map of Marine Science Institute
- Website: www.sfbaymsi.org

The Marine Science Institute (SF Bay MSI) is a nonprofit organization Redwood City, California, United States. It focuses on marine science research and education. MSI was founded in 1970.

== Education and research ==
The Marine Science Institute offers tours of the Bay in Antioch in the January and February months, and the rest of the time based out of Redwood City at their main location and research station along the banks of Redwood Creek. The institute allows students at schools around the bay to observe and interact with the natural environment. Marine life is often collected, measured for size, and documented to add to a database to continually monitor conditions and overall health within the bay. MSI also trains teachers in integrating technology and science into their own curriculums. The Marine Science Institute also hosts an Earth Day celebration annually. Other events organized by MSI include coastal hikes, cleanups, tide walks, and voyages for the general public.

== Robert G. Brownlee ==
The 90-foot (27 m) by 30-foot (9.1 m) research vessel built to satisfy the needs of MSI was named after Robert Brownlee whose foundation donated funds for the vessel. Construction of the steel vessel with hull depth of 11.8-foot (3.6 m), hull 474, was completed by the Marco Shipyards in Seattle in 1998. Original specifications for the craft had a propulsion system, that could reach 12 knots, comprising two 860-millimetre (34 in) propellers driven by a pair of 250 horsepower Cummins diesels. The vessel, which can fit up to 70 students, has facilities for several science activities including studying plankton and fish with holding tanks below deck as well as running hydrology tests. Following the Cosco Busan oil spill the vessel was used to take children out showing the damage the Bay Bridge suffered firsthand as well as take comparative data on how the spill affected marine life in the area.

== Gallery ==
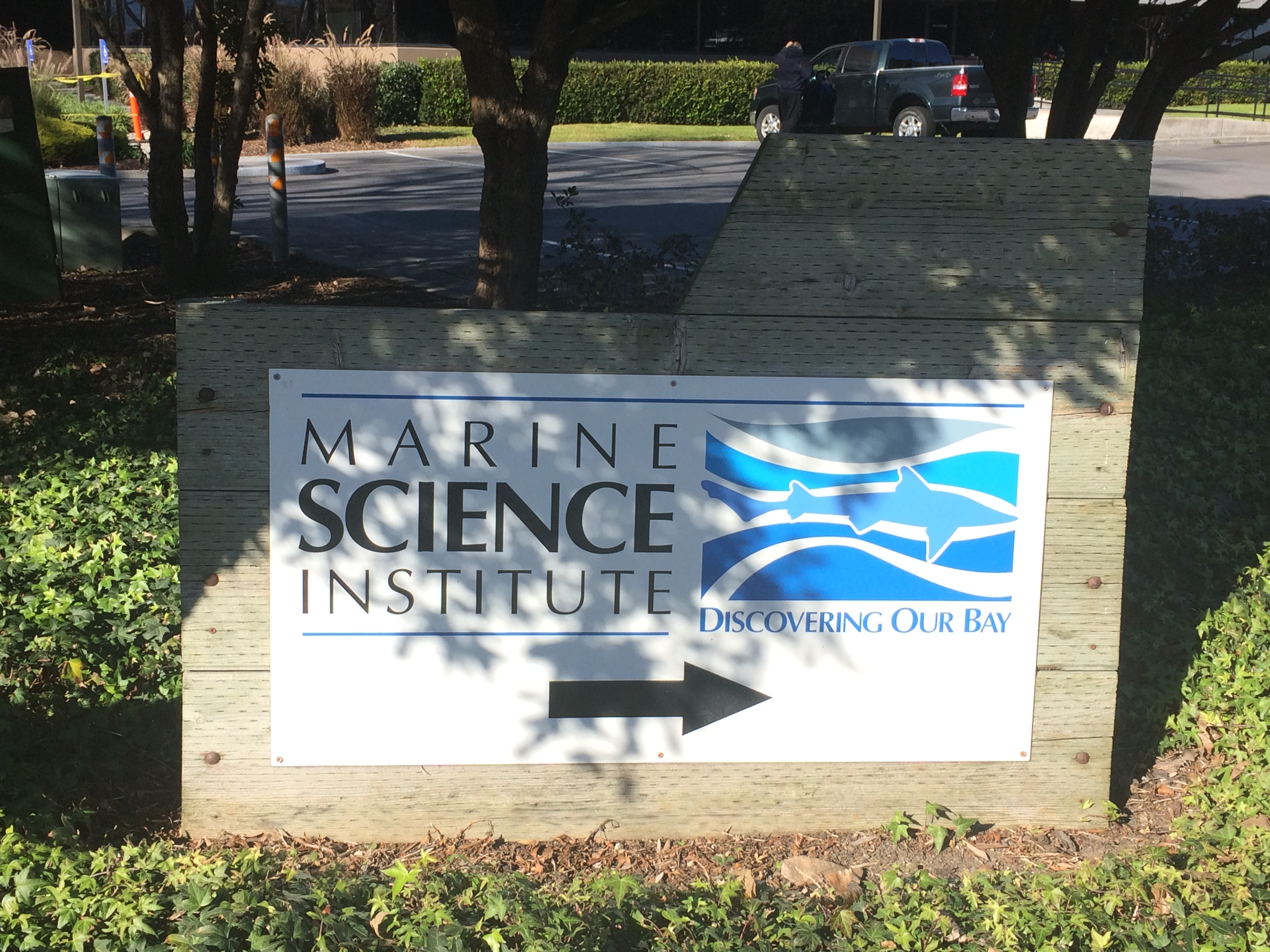
Front entrance sign

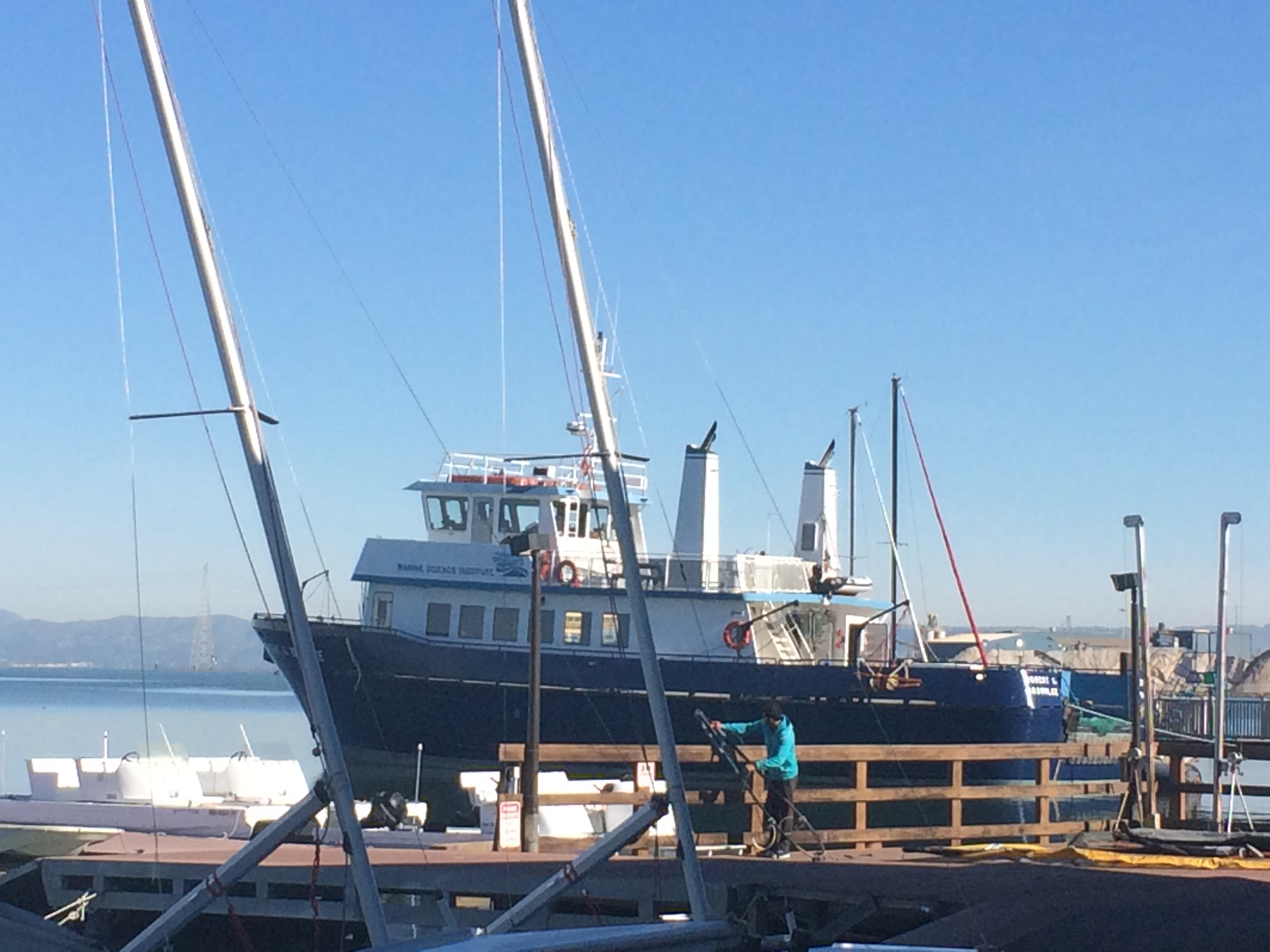
Robert G. Brownlee docked

== See also ==
- Don Edwards San Francisco Bay National Wildlife Refuge
- San Francisco Bay
