= Invitrogen =

Subsidiary of Thermo Fisher Scientific

- Company type: Subsidiary
- Traded as: Nasdaq: IVGN
- Founded: 1987; 39 years ago
- Successor: Life Technologies
- Headquarters: Waltham, Massachusetts, U.S.
- Key people: Marc N. Casper (president & CEO)
- Parent: Thermo Fisher Scientific

Invitrogen is one of several brands under the Thermo Fisher Scientific corporation. The product line includes various subbrands of biotechnology products, such as machines and consumables for polymerase chain reaction, reverse transcription, cloning, culturing, stem cell production, cell therapy, regenerative medicine, immunotherapy, transfection, DNA/RNA purification, diagnostic tests, antibodies, and immunoassays.

The predecessor corporation was Invitrogen Corporation (formerly traded as Nasdaq: IVGN), headquartered in Carlsbad, California. In 2008, a merger between Applied Biosystems and Invitrogen was finalized, creating Life Technologies. The latter was acquired by Thermo Fisher Scientific in 2014.

== History ==
=== Founding ===
Invitrogen was founded in 1987 by Lyle Turner, Joe Fernandez, and William McConnell and was incorporated in 1989. The company initially found success with its kits for molecular cloning—notably, The Librarian, a kit for making cDNA libraries, and the FastTrack Kit for mRNA isolation from biological samples.

William McConnell left the company in 1989.

In 1999, the company, which had reached sales of $33 million the prior year, went public, with a plan of consolidating biotechnology research boutique suppliers. The company had become quite successful at licensing technologies into its niche market, of cloning and expression, but determined that many niche leaders were not interested in licensing, and M&A needed to be added to the company's set of tools for growth.

=== Mergers and acquisitions ===
Invitrogen acquired NOVEX, in cloned protein characterization, within 60 days of going public. In December 1999, it purchased Research Genetics, Inc., a leader in genomics and synthetic DNA chemistry, becoming a $100 million (annual sales) company within a year of its IPO.

The business scope expanded significantly when it acquired the rival biotechnology and cell culture company Life Technologies in 2000; Life had been formed in 1983 when GIBCO (Grand Island Biological Company) which had been founded around 1960 in New York, merged with a reagent company called Bethesda Research Laboratories. The company continued to add technologies through a series of mergers and acquisitions, which broadened its customer base and strengthened its intellectual property portfolio. Among these, established companies such as Ethrog Biotechnology, Molecular Probes (fluorescence-based detection), Dynal (magnetic bead–based separation), Panvera (proteins and assays for drug screening), InforMax (software for computational biology and bioinformatics), BioSource (cellular pathway analysis), CellzDirect (cell products and services for research) and Zymed and Caltag Laboratories (primary and secondary antibodies) have been brought under the Invitrogen brand. Invitrogen acquired Sequitur in 2003 to obtain Sequitur's proprietary Stealth(TM) RNAi technology.

In 2008, Invitrogen virtually doubled its size with the purchase of biotech instrumentation company Applied Biosystems, maker of DNA sequencing and PCR machines and reagents. The company then renamed the overall organization as Life Technologies. The Invitrogen brand and most of the brands acquired still exist on product packaging, although the overall company is called Life Technologies. In summer 2010, the company acquired the computer chip DNA sequencing company Ion Torrent Systems. Through this history of acquisitions and continued product research and development, Invitrogen / Life Technologies had over 50,000 products.

== Portfolio ==
=== Key products and technologies ===
Utilizing this business strategy, Invitrogen represented a large number of products: Dynabeads magnetic separation technology, GIBCO cell culture media and reagents, SuperScript reverse transcriptase, Platinum Taq polymerase, TOPO cloning and expression products, Novex protein electrophoresis products, and numerous fluorescent reagents such as Qdot nanocrystals, Alexa Fluor, DyLight, RiboGreen and SYBR dyes. Invitrogen currently offers more than 25,000 products and services to support research in cellular analysis, genomics, proteomics, and drug discovery, and seeks to address research problems in developing fields, including biodefense and environmental diagnostics, bioinformatics, epigenetics, and stem cell research.

=== Innovation and impact ===
Under a contract from the Defense Threat Reduction Agency (DTRA), the company developed a prototype hand-held pathogen detection system for the detection of multiple toxins such as ricin, staphylococcal enterotoxin, and botulinum toxin, as well as bacteria that cause anthrax, plague, and other diseases, in a single sample. Invitrogen was also awarded a contract to provide kits for detecting possible E. coli O157 contamination in food at the 2008 Summer Olympics in Beijing, China. The monitoring program, based on World Health Organization food standards, is conducted by the Beijing Centers for Disease Control and Prevention (CDC) and the Olympic Food Safety program. Similarly, the company's PathAlert technology was selected to monitor Yersinia pestis, the causative agent of the plague, at the Torino Winter Games in 2006. Their Qubit platform for RNA, DNA, and protein quantitation was awarded an R&D 100 Award as being a "Top 100 Technologically Significant New Product" by R&D Magazine. The Qubit Flex, a later model of the Qubit, was a finalist for the same award in 2020.

Invitrogen developed and introduced stem cell products. Among more than 1,200 products for stem cell research, the company offered an engineered stem cell line (BG01v/hOG) and various STEMPRO products for manual passaging of human embryonic stem cells (hESC), to promote hESC growth and expansion, and to allow scientists to ascertain hESC pluripotency.
