= Polony (biology) =

Punctual group of DNA

Polony is a contraction of "polymerase colony," a small colony of DNA.

Polonies are discrete clonal amplifications of a single DNA molecule, grown in a gel matrix. This approach greatly improves the signal-to-noise ratio. Polonies can be generated using several techniques that include solid-phase polymerase chain reaction (PCR) in polyacrylamide gels. However, other earlier patented technologies, such as that from Manteia Predictive Medicine (acquired by Solexa), which generate DNA on a solid-phase surface by bridge amplification, are generally referred to as "clusters".

The terminology and distinction between 'polony' and 'cluster' have become confused recently. Growth of clonal copies of DNA on bead surfaces remains to be generically named although some also seek to name this technique as a "polony" method. The concept of localizing and analyzing regions containing clonal nucleic acid populations was first described in patents by Brown, et al.. (assigned to Genomic Nanosystems), however these are in liquid phase. Clusters are distinct in that they are based on solid-phase amplification of single DNA molecules where the DNA has been covalently attached to a surface. This technology, initially coined "DNA colony generation", had been invented and developed in late 1996 at Glaxo-Welcome's Geneva Biomedical Research Institute (GBRI), by Dr Pascal Mayer and Dr Laurent Farinelli, and was publicly presented for the first time in 1998. It was finally brought to market by Solexa. Solexa Ltd/INC (Bentley et al.).
