= Form S-4 =

Form issued by the U.S. Securities and Exchange Commission

Form S-4 is a form filed with the U.S. Securities and Exchange Commission relating to a business combination or exchange offer. This filing contains details relating to share distribution, amounts, terms, and other information relating to any or all merger or exchange offers.
