= Sequencing by hybridization =

Sequencing by hybridization is a class of methods for determining the order in which nucleotides occur on a strand of DNA. Typically used for looking for small changes relative to a known DNA sequence. The binding of one strand of DNA to its complementary strand in the DNA double-helix (known as hybridization) is sensitive to even single-base mismatches when the hybrid region is short or if specialized mismatch detection proteins are present. This is exploited in a variety of ways, most notably via DNA chips or microarrays with thousands to billions of synthetic oligonucleotides found in a genome of interest plus many known variations or even all possible single-base variations.

The type of sequencing by hybridization described above has largely been displaced by other methods, including sequencing by synthesis, and sequencing by ligation (as well as pore-based methods). However hybridization of oligonucleotides is still used in some sequencing schemes, including hybridization-assisted pore-based sequencing, and reversible hybridization.

== Examples of commercial systems ==
- Affymetrix (true sequencing-by-hybridization)
- NABsys (Hybridization-assisted pore-based sequencing)
- Complete Genomics Inc. (reversible-hybridization of probes that call-out a single base with each hybridization)

== See also ==
- Sequencing by ligation
