= QuidelOrtho =

American healthcare company

QuidelOrtho Corporation
- Type: Public
- Traded as: Nasdaq: QDEL; S&P 600 component
- Industry: Pharmaceutical Industry
- Founded: 1979; 47 years ago
- Founder: Dr. David H. Katz, M.D.
- Headquarters: San Diego, California, U.S.
- Key people: Brian Blaser (CEO); Micah Young (CFO)
- Products: Diagnostic healthcare manufacturer
- Revenue: ▼US$3.0 billion (2023)
- Number of employees: 7,100 (December 31, 2023)
- Website: quidelortho.com

QuidelOrtho Corporation is an American manufacturer of diagnostic healthcare products that are sold worldwide.

On May 8, 2020 the U.S. Food and Drug Administration (FDA) issued to Quidel the first emergency use authorization (EUA) for a COVID-19 rapid antigen test, a new category of tests for use in the ongoing pandemic. These diagnostic tests quickly detect fragments of proteins found on or within the virus by testing samples collected from the nasal cavity using swabs.

== History ==
Quidel was founded by Dr. David H. Katz, M.D., commencing operations in 1981 and launched its first products in 1984. Quidel Corporation was formed in 1991 when Quidel and Monoclonal Antibodies merged.

In 1988, Dr. Katz, a founder and chief scientific officer at Quidel, resigned to devote his energies to the Medical Biology Institute, a nonprofit research group in La Jolla, California that is closely allied with Quidel.

On June 18, 1997 Quidel settled a lawsuit with Becton Dickinson. Quidel had been accused of infringing patents on Becton's strep and chlamydia products. Quidel agreed to buy a product license and pay royalties on its product sales.

In 1999, Quidel acquired Metra Biosystems, Inc. to participate in bone health assessment. In 2000, Quidel acquired Litmus Concepts, Inc., a privately held in vitro diagnostic company.

In February 2004, Inverness Medical Innovations sued Quidel for patent infringement. That same month, Quidel countersued against Inverness.

In 2010, Quidel acquired Diagnostic Hybrids, Inc. a privately held in vitro diagnostic company. In 2013, Quidel acquired BioHelix Corporation, established in 2004, and was to pay $10 million to the BioHelix shareholders.

In May 2020, Quidel’s Sofia 2 SARS Antigen FIA has become the first COVID-19 rapid antigen test to be granted Emergency Use Authorization (EUA) by the FDA, approved by FDA director in charge of authorizing test EUAs, Tim Stenzel. Stenzel was also Quidel’s former Chief Science Officer who, while leading Quidel, oversaw the initial launch of the Sofia instrument.

In December 2021, Quidel announced it would acquire Ortho Clinical Diagnostics Holdings for $6 billion in cash and stock, increasing the range of COVID-19 antigen and antibody tests the business is able to offer.

In February 2024, CEO Douglas Bryant was fired, being replaced by Michael Iskra as interim CEO.

=== List of mergers and acquisitions ===
The following is an illustration of the company's major mergers and acquisitions and historical predecessors:

- Quidel (Est. 1991)
  - Metra Biosystems, Inc. (Acq 1999)
  - Litmus Concepts, Inc. (Acq 2000)
  - Diagnostic Hybrids, Inc. (Acq 2010)
  - BioHelix Corporation (Acq 2013)
  - Ortho Clinical Diagnostics (Acq 2021)
    - Ortho Diagnostics Systems
      - Ortho Products, Inc. (Est. 1939)
    - Johnson & Johnson Clinical Diagnostics

== Expertise ==
Since its merger, Quidel has expanded its product base through internal development and acquisition with a focus on increasing its research and development efforts to accelerate the rate of new product introductions.

Quidel's core competencies and capabilities include immunoassay development, automated manufacturing, monoclonal antibody characterization and development, and molecular assay development.

== Products ==
Quidel's current products fall generally into these categories: (1) lateral flow, where it focuses on infectious disease and reproductive health; (2) direct fluorescent antibodies (DFA), with expertise in infectious disease and virology; (3) micro-titer production, with a focus on bone and complement pathway markets; (4) fluorescent immunoassay products (Sofia); and (5) molecular diagnostic products.

These products include assays such as QuickVue, Thyretain and the new Sofia and AmpliVue brands, which focus on diagnosing influenza, thyroid disease, and many other diseases, and can improve the healthcare quality of hospitals.

During 2011, the US Food and Drug Administration (FDA) and the European Conformity Mark provided Quidel with 510(k) clearance for selling Sofia Analyzer, and another 510(k) clearance for the Quidel Molecular hMPV Assay.
