= Ortho Clinical Diagnostics =

Pharmaceutical company

Ortho Clinical Diagnostics Holdings plc
- Type: Public
- Industry: Medical diagnostics
- Founded: 1939; 87 years ago Linden, New Jersey, U.S.
- Headquarters: 1001 US-202, Raritan, New Jersey, U.S.
- Area served: Worldwide
- Key people: Kenneth F. Buechler (chairman); Brian Blaser (chief executive officer); Micah Young (CFO); Michael Schlesinger (CLO)
- Revenue: $1.8 billion (2018)
- Owner: Quidel Corporation
- Number of employees: 4,400 (2019)
- Website: orthoclinicaldiagnostics.com

Ortho Clinical Diagnostics (now QuidelOrtho) is an in vitro diagnostics company that made products and diagnostic equipment for blood testing. Ortho served two primary industries in the medical field: clinical laboratories, by producing platforms and assays that test for a variety of diseases, conditions, and substances; and immunohematology, by providing the means to ensure blood transfusion recipients receive appropriate and compatible blood.

Johnson and Johnson acquired Eastman Kodak's Clinical Diagnostics Division in 1994 (to form Johnson & Johnson Clinical Diagnostics), which was then merged with Ortho Diagnostic Systems in 1997. QuidelOrtho's global corporate offices are in Raritan, New Jersey, while their global research and development center is in Rochester, New York.

In 2014, The Carlyle Group purchased the company from Johnson & Johnson for $4.15 billion. Ortho Clinical Diagnostics now operated as an independent company, up until its acquisition by Quidel Corporation for $6 billion, on May 27, 2022.

== History ==
1939: Ortho Products, Inc., is formed in Linden, New Jersey, as a division of Johnson & Johnson.

1944: Philip Levine, in the field of hematology, joins Ortho Products to continue his research into the mechanics of the Rh system in human blood.

1997: Ortho Diagnostics Systems and Johnson & Johnson Clinical Diagnostics merge and begin operating as Ortho Clinical Diagnostics.

2001: Ortho becomes the first diagnostic company to receive US FDA approval for automated random access hepatitis tests.

2006: Ortho launches the first FDA-licensed test to screen blood donations for exposure to Chagas disease.

2014: The Carlyle Group acquires Ortho Clinical Diagnostics for $4.15 billion.

2015: Ortho receives FDA clearance for its ORTHO VISION Analyzer, which automates the full range of immunohematology testing and helps improve the safety of blood transfusions by reducing laboratories' reliance on manual methods.

2017: FDA approves Ortho's HIV Combo test for the Vitros immunodiagnostic system. The test detects both HIV-1 and HIV-2 antibodies and the p24 antigen, and enables detection of HIV-1 acute infection earlier than previous assays.

2021: Quidel announced it would acquire Ortho Clinical Diagnostics Holdings for $6 billion in cash and stock, increasing the range of COVID-19 antigen and antibody tests the business is able to offer.

== Business operations ==
Ortho produces in-vitro diagnostics equipment and associated assays and reagents, serving the clinical laboratories and immunohematology sectors of the medical field.
Ortho sells its products in more than 125 countries and is targeting emerging markets for future growth.
