= Advantage Business Marketing =

American digital marketing and information services company

- Formerly: Advantage Business Media
- Type: Private
- Industry: Marketing
- Founded: 2006
- Founder: Rich Reiff; George Fox
- Defunct: June 2019
- Fate: Bankruptcy
- Headquarters: Rockaway, New Jersey
- Key people: George Fox, President (2010)
- Services: Marketing; publishing
- Number of employees: >200 (2010)
- Parent: Owner Resource Group
- Website: Archived Advantage Business Media homepage; Archived Advantage Business Marketing homepage

Advantage Business Marketing (ABM) was a private American digital marketing and information services company owned by the venture capital firm Owner Resource Group. The company was founded in 2006 and was based in Rockaway, New Jersey, United States. It filed for bankruptcy in June 2019.

== Business model ==
In the period between 2006 and 2014, the company transitioned from print-centric to digital media, increasing digital revenues from 11% to 50% of total revenues. The company's growth during this period came from both "organic" growth and strategic acquisitions. In 2009 the firm was described as a "business to business magazine publisher", which could be interpreted as a publisher of trade magazines.

In 2018, the organization transitioned fully from a digital media organization to a digital marketing organization, following market trends. As such, the company changed its name from Advantage Business Media to Advantage Business Marketing, updated its logo, and began the overhaul of its digital websites and assets.

The organization offered digital marketing services including inbound marketing, branding, automation services, customer relationship management integration, and data management.

== History ==
In 2006, Rich Reiff and George Fox purchased several publications from Reed Business Information's New Product Division, formerly known as Gordon Publications, with the backing of private equity provided by Catalyst Investors.

Also in 2006, the company launched the FindGuru business-to-business-focused search engine as a revised and rebranded ReedLink tool originally available from Reed Business Information.

In 2011, ABM acquired Continuity Insights and Vicon Publishing. Vicon Publishing was renamed by ABM to Vicon Business Media as a subsidiary operated out of New Hampshire. In 2013 ABM acquired eMedia Vitals.

In 2014, the firm was sold by Catalyst to Owners Resource Group (ORG), a private equity firm based in Austin, Texas, for undisclosed terms. This acquisition was ORG's first foray in the media business. In March 2014, co-founder Richard Reiff left the firm, leaving the CEO position vacant, though there is an indication that Jim Lonergan was brought in as CEO by the new owner.

In 2018, Lonergan was replaced by Bruce Cummings and the company rebranded, changing its name to Advantage Business Marketing.

On June 11, 2019, Cummings told all employees that the company was filing for bankruptcy and immediately closing. Staff had until the end of the day to vacate the premises. No severance package was given to employees, customers lost much of what they'd purchased, and many vendors were never paid.

== Titles published by ABM ==
As of 2017, ABM published 23 titles. Publication titles and ISO 4 abbreviations are as follows:

- ALN Magazine (ALN Mag.)
- ALN World (ALN World), no longer published
- Bioscience Technology (Biosci. Technol.)
- CED, formerly Communications, Engineering & Design
- Chem.Info
- Continuity Insights (Cont. Ins.), no longer an ABM brand
- Chromatography Techniques (Chromatogr. Tech.), no longer an ABM brand
- Controlled Environments Magazine (Control. Environ. Mag.)
- DFI News Digital Forensic Investigator (DFI News Digit. Forensic Investig.), no longer published
- Drug Discovery & Development (Drug Discov. Dev. also DDD Mag.)
- Electronic Component News (Electron. Compon. News also ECN)
- Food Manufacturing (Food Manuf.)
- Forensic Magazine (Forensic Mag.)
- Industrial Distribution (Ind. Distribution)
- Industrial Maintenance & Plant Operations (Ind. Maintenance Plant Oper.)
- Laboratory Design (Lab. Des.)
- Laboratory Equipment (Lab. Equip.)
- Manufacturing Business Technology (Manuf. Bus. Technol.)
- Manufacturing.net (Manuf. Net.)
- Medical Design Technology (Med. Des. Technol.)
- Pharmaceutical Processing (Pharm. Process.)
- Product Design & Development (Prod. Des. Dev.)
- R&D Magazine (R&D Mag.)
- Scientific Computing (Sci. Comput.)
- Surgical Products (Surg. Prod.)
- Wireless Design & Development (Wirel. Des. Dev.)
- Wireless Week (Wirel. Week)
