= Molecular Informatics =

- Discipline: Cheminformatics, quantitative structure–activity relationships, combinatorial chemistry
- Language: English
- Edited by: Knut Baumann, Alexandre Varnek, Hanoch Senderowitz, Yoshihiro Yamanishi

Publication details
- Former names: Quantitative Structure-Activity Relationships, QSAR & Combinatorial Science
- History: 1981–present
- Publisher: Wiley VCH
- Frequency: Monthly
- Impact factor: 3.1 (2024)

Standard abbreviations
- ISO 4: Mol. Inform.

Indexing
- CODEN: MIONBS
- ISSN: 1868-1743 (print); 1868-1751 (web)
- LCCN: 2010200090
- OCLC no.: 605923838
- Quantitative Structure-Activity Relationships
- ISSN: 0931-8771
- QSAR & Combinatorial Science
- ISSN: 1611-020X

Links
- Journal homepage; Online access; Online archive

Molecular Informatics is a peer-reviewed scientific journal published by Wiley VCH. It covers research in cheminformatics, quantitative structure–activity relationships, and combinatorial chemistry. It was established in 1981 as Quantitative Structure-Activity Relationships and renamed to QSAR & Combinatorial Science in 2003, before obtaining its present name in 2010. According to the Journal Citation Reports, the journal has a 2012 impact factor of 2.338.
