= Sequencing by ligation =

Sequencing by ligation is a DNA sequencing method that uses the enzyme DNA ligase to identify the nucleotide present at a given position in a DNA sequence. Unlike most currently popular DNA sequencing methods, this method does not use a DNA polymerase to create a second strand. Instead, the mismatch sensitivity of a DNA ligase enzyme is used to determine the underlying sequence of the target DNA molecule.

== Process ==
DNA ligase is an enzyme that joins together ends of DNA molecules. Although commonly represented as joining two pairs of ends at once, as in the ligation of restriction enzyme fragments, ligase can also join the ends on only one of the two strands (for example, when the other strand is already continuous or lacks a terminal phosphate necessary for ligation). DNA ligase is sensitive to the structure of DNA and has very low efficiency when there are mismatches between the bases of the two strands.

Sequencing by ligation relies upon the sensitivity of DNA ligase for base-pairing mismatches. The target molecule to be sequenced is a single strand of unknown DNA sequence, flanked on at least one end by a known sequence. A short "anchor" strand is brought in to bind the known sequence.

A mixed pool of probe oligonucleotides is then brought in (eight or nine bases long), labeled (typically with fluorescent dyes) according to the position that will be sequenced. These molecules hybridize to the target DNA sequence, next to the anchor sequence, and DNA ligase preferentially joins the molecule to the anchor when its bases match the unknown DNA sequence. Based on the fluorescence produced by the molecule, one can infer the identity of the nucleotide at this position in the unknown sequence.

The oligonucleotide probes may also be constructed with cleavable linkages which can be cleaved after identifying the label. This will both remove the label and regenerate a 5' phosphate on the end of the ligated probe, preparing the system for another round of ligation. This cycle can be repeated several times to read longer sequences. This sequences every Nth base, where N is the length of the probe left behind after cleavage. To sequence the skipped positions, the anchor and ligated oligonucleotides may be stripped off the target DNA sequence, and another round of sequencing by ligation started with an anchor one or more bases shorter.

A simpler, albeit more limited, technique is to do repeated rounds of a single ligation where the label corresponds to different position in the probe, followed by stripping the anchor and ligated probe.

Sequencing by ligation can proceed in either direction (either 5'-3' or 3'-5') depending on which end of the probe oligonucleotides are blocked by the label. The 3'-5' direction is more efficient for doing multiple cycles of ligation. Note that this is the opposite direction to polymerase based sequencing methods.

== Limitations ==
This sequencing by ligation method has been reported to have problems sequencing palindromic sequences.

== See also ==
- Sequencing by hybridization
- 2 Base Encoding
- ABI Solid Sequencing
