= DNA analyzer =

Device for analyzing human DNA

A DNA analyzer is a device used to determine characteristics of a person's DNA. For example, genetic fingerprinting can be conducted with a portable DNA analyzer.
