= Life Technologies =

Biotech company

Life Technologies Corporation
- Type: Subsidiary
- Industry: Life Science/Biotechnology
- Predecessor: Invitrogen; Applied Biosystems
- Founded: 2008
- Fate: Acquired by Thermo Fisher
- Headquarters: Carlsbad, California, U.S.
- Parent: Thermo Fisher Scientific
- Website: www.lifetechnologies.com

Life Technologies Corporation was a biotech company founded in November 2008 through a US $6.7 billion merger of Invitrogen Corporation and Applied Biosystems Inc. The joint sales of the combined companies were about $3.5 billion; they had about 9,500 employees and owned more than 3,600 licenses and patents.

== Company name ==
The name "Life Technologies" was an old name from the history of Invitrogen. GIBCO (Grand Island Biological Company) had been founded around 1960 in New York; in 1983 GIBCO merged with a reagent company called Bethesda Research Laboratories (BRL) and the merged company was named Life Technologies. In 2000, Invitrogen acquired Life Technologies and discontinued that name. When Invitrogen and Applied Biosystems merged, the companies revived the name.

The use of the "Life Technologies" brand name is disputed. Life Technologies (India) Private Limited, a company founded in 2002, operating in this corporate name claims ownership of the brand name.

The "Life Technologies" brand language and industrial design for the award-winning Ion Proton Sequencer was developed by RKS Design.

== Acquisition ==
Between its formation in 2008 and its acquisition by Thermo Fisher Scientific in 2014, Life Technologies Corporation was an independent multinational corporation based in Carlsbad, California, United States.

In 2013, they launched a project called Claritas Genomics in partnership with Boston Children's Hospital. With Children's as a major shareholder, Claritas Genomics merged the knowledge, resources, and employees of the Genetic Diagnostic Lab at the Boston hospital, a CLIA-certified facility that provided more than 100 genetic tests, including numerous specific diagnostics created at Boston Children's. It also made use of the Ion Proton Sequencer from Life Technologies, a precise benchtop device that might be scaled for widespread use in new assays.

Later, in 2013, Thermo Fisher agreed to buy Life Technologies for $13.6 billion.

== Legal disputes ==
A court case involving Life Technologies (as the former Applera Corp) ended in January 2014, as the Connecticut District Court penalized Life Technologies Corp over $60 million for patent infringements by its parent companies prior to the merger. The jury awarded $48 million in royalty damages to the plaintiffs Enzo Biochem, Inc, Enzo Life Sciences, and Yale University.
