= Christopher H. Contag =

Biomedical academic

Christopher Heinz Contag
- Born: September 8, 1959 (age 67); New Ulm, Minnesota, U.S.
- Education: University of Minnesota, Minneapolis B.S. Biology (1982); Ph.D. Microbiology (1988)
- Scientific career
- Fields: Molecular Imaging; Bioluminescence imaging; Medical optical imaging
- Workplaces: Stanford University; Michigan State University

Christopher H. Contag (born September 8, 1959) is an American biomedical scientist whose research contributed to the development of in vivo bioluminescence imaging (BLI), a technique that uses light-emitting biological markers to visualize cellular and molecular processes in living animals. He is a professor emeritus at Stanford University and holds the James and Kathleen Cornelius Endowed Chair in the Departments of Biomedical Engineering and Microbiology, Genetics, and Immunology at Michigan State University (MSU). He is the founding director of the Institute for Quantitative Health Science and Engineering (IQ) at MSU and served as the inaugural chair of Michigan State University's Department of Biomedical Engineering.

The bioluminescence imaging platform he co-developed in the 1990s was subsequently commercialized through Xenogen Corporation, which was later acquired by Caliper Life Sciences and subsequently by PerkinElmer (now Revvity), and the technology has been adopted widely in preclinical pharmaceutical research. Contag has co-founded several other biotechnology companies and holds twenty-nine patents across imaging, drug delivery, and immunotherapy.

== Education and training ==
Contag received a B.S. in Biology from the University of Minnesota in 1982 and a Ph.D. in Microbiology from the same in 1988, where his doctoral research under Professors Ashley Haase and Peter Plagemann examined viral infections of the central nervous system.

From 1990 to 1994, he was a postdoctoral fellow in the Department of Microbiology and Immunology at Stanford University, working under James Mullins (subsequently at the University of Washington). During this period his research focused on mother-to-infant transmission of HIV, and he began developing bioluminescence-based imaging methods to track infections in living animal models.

== Career ==
Contag joined the Stanford University School of Medicine faculty in 1995 as an instructor in Pediatrics, with a joint appointment in Microbiology and Immunology. He subsequently held positions as Associate Chief of the Division of Neonatal and Developmental Medicine, director of Stanford's Center for Innovation in In Vivo Imaging (SCI3), and co-director of the Molecular Imaging Program at Stanford (MIPS) and the Child Health Research Institute (CHRI). He was also a member of the Bio-X faculty for interdisciplinary sciences and the Immunology Faculty.

In 2016, he moved to Michigan State University to lead the newly established Institute for Quantitative Health Science and Engineering and to found a new Department of Biomedical Engineering, serving as its inaugural chair. He holds a courtesy professorship in MSU's Center for Bioethics and Social Justice.

== Research ==
=== Bioluminescence imaging ===
Contag's early work established that bioluminescent reporter enzymes — proteins that emit light as part of a biochemical reaction — could be introduced into bacteria or mammalian cells and used to track those cells non-invasively in living animal subjects. Publications from his laboratory in the mid-1990s reported the use of luciferase-expressing Salmonella to detect bacterial infections in mice, and subsequent work extended this approach to imaging gene expression, tumor growth, and immune cell trafficking.

This work led to a patent (U.S. Pat. No. 6,939,533), co-invented with Pamela R. Contag and David A. Benaron, covering the non-invasive localization of light-emitting conjugates in mammals. The technology was licensed to Xenogen Corporation, a company Contag co-founded, which developed and commercialized dedicated small-animal bioluminescence imaging instruments. Xenogen was acquired by PerkinElmer in 2006 and its imaging platform is now marketed under the Revvity brand.

Research using this imaging platform from his laboratory included studies showing that Listeria monocytogenes, a foodborne pathogen, persists in the gallbladder and is excreted in response to fat intake — a finding with implications for understanding foodborne transmission. Additional work demonstrated that natural killer T cells could deliver oncolytic viruses to tumors and that residual cancer cells following targeted therapy exhibit stem cell characteristics.

Stanford Cancer Institute recently published an article in Blood (journal) - Wikipedia that evaluated Orca-T, a cell therapy that prevents triggering immune overactivation during stem cell transplants and visualized this in partnership with Contag. Orca-T was recently approved by the FDA as a clinical use regulatory T-cell based therapy.

=== Other research areas ===
Contag's laboratory has also investigated the use of engineered endosymbionts — bacteria adapted to live inside mammalian cells — as tools to modify cell surface markers and signaling molecules, with potential applications in cell therapy. Additional work has examined extracellular vesicles as mediators of intercellular communication in cancer biology, and the development of Gla-domain proteins that bind phosphatidylserine on cell surfaces and are internalized, as a targeted delivery platform for cancer therapeutics. His laboratory has also explored magnetic particle imaging using magnetotactic bacteria as contrast agents.

== Patents and entrepreneurship ==
Contag holds twenty-nine patents across imaging, drug delivery, immunotherapy, optical systems, and related areas. In addition to Xenogen Corporation, he has co-founded PixelGear, EXOForce, and BioEclipse Therapeutics (formerly ConcentRx Corp.), a cancer immunotherapy company based in the San Francisco Bay Area. BioEclipse was co-founded in part on a patent (U.S. Pat. No. 9,101,658) covering the use of immune cells to deliver oncolytic viruses to tumors.

== Recognition and professional roles ==
Contag was a founding member of the Society for Molecular Imaging (SMI), now incorporated into the World Molecular Imaging Society (WMIS), and has served as president of both organizations — SMI in 2002 and WMIS in 2016. He received the Achievement Award from the SMI and the Britton Chance Award from SPIE, the international society for optics and photonics, for contributions to biomedical optics. He was inducted into the Independent School District 88 Hall of Fame in New Ulm, Minnesota in 2016.

He has authored more than 300 peer-reviewed publications, with work appearing in journals including Nature (journal), Science (journal), Nature Medicine, Nature Biotechnology, and the Proceedings of the National Academy of Sciences of the United States of America. As of February 2026 Contag had an h-index score of 95.
