= Custer Observatory =

Observatory in New York state, US

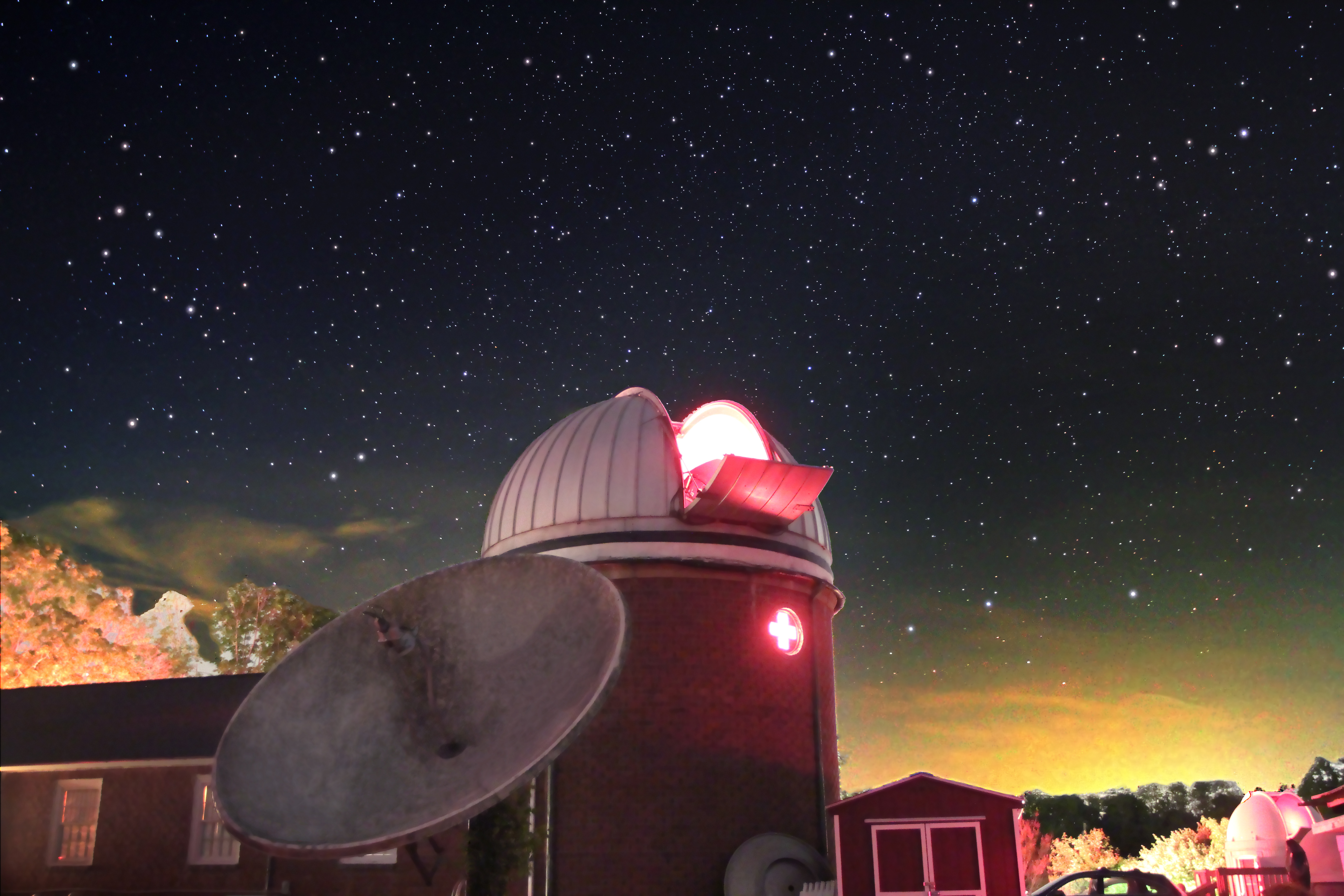
- Location: Southold, New York
- Coordinates: 41°03′07″N 72°26′04″W
- Website: www.custerobservatory.org
- Related media on Commons

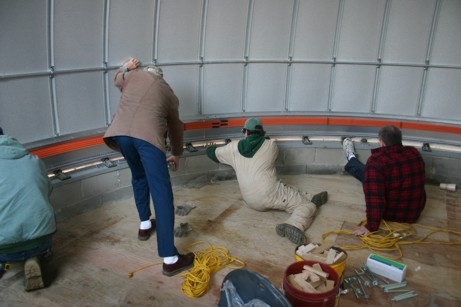
Installation of new dome (2007)

Custer Observatory is an astronomical observatory located in Southold, New York. It is owned and operated by the Custer Institute. Facing Peconic Bay and Shelter Island, Custer's location is host to some of the darkest skies on Long Island as a result of the comparatively lower levels of light pollution in the area.

== History ==
The Custer Institute is Long Island's oldest public observatory, and was founded in 1927 by Charles Wesley Elmer (co-founder of the Perkin-Elmer Optical Company) and fellow amateur astronomers. The name was adopted to honor the hospitality of Mrs. Elmer, the grand-niece of General George Armstrong Custer. In 1942, the Custer Institute was incorporated as a non-profit educational corporation in the State of New York.

In 1938, the group purchased the land the institute now occupies. The initial construction of the observatory was completed in the spring of 1939. A 100-seat lecture hall was added in 1945. A three-story tower, library and observatory dome were built in 1947. A shed housing three sliding-roof observatories was built for the institute in 1954.

== Telescopes ==
Custer has acquired a collection of telescopes of many sizes and descriptions including a 10" refracting telescope. This telescope is in the main observatory dome.

Custer's 10” refracting telescope was manufactured in England. The telescope's dialyte lenses make it apochromatic, providing enhanced views of the Solar System and deep space objects. The folded light path construction uses mirrors to reduce the telescope's size, allowing the long f/12 focal length telescope to fit in Custer's dome.

The telescope is attached to a computer-controlled Fornax 152 equatorial mount for aiming and object tracking. The assembly can be raised/lowered on the Pier-Tech pier to accommodate most users’ heights for comfortable viewing.

Previously, the dome was home to a 25-inch (f/5) reflector. To bring the eyepiece of this telescope to a level that does not require observers to climb a high ladder, the optics on this telescope were modified by Justine Haupt, an engineer at Brookhaven National Lab.

== Custer Library ==
The Custer Library contains a number of astronomy and science books dating from the 19th century to the present. It also houses the institute's videotape and 35mm astronomical slide collections. It contains National Geographic, Sky & Telescope, Astronomy, and Scientific American magazines dating back numerous decades. Membership to the Custer Institute grants access to their library.

== Custer Exhibit Room ==
The Custer Institute Exhibit Room contains the following in its collection:

- Henry Fitz, early Custer member and famous telescope mirror maker's Grinding Table. (This table is similar to the one on display at the Smithsonian in Washington, DC.)
- James Short's circa 1750 Gregorian telescope variation designed to read the separation of binary stars. One of only three known to exist.
- Various 18th and 19th centuries vintage spectrometers and sextants, along with other astronomical devices.
- The Custer Rock Collection including geodes and numerous Fossilized Rocks.
- The Custer Meteorite Collection, which includes a Shergottite from Mars.
- Numerous astronomical, sunspot, and aurora pictures taken by past and present members.
- The Custer Civil War Bullet Collection

== Images ==
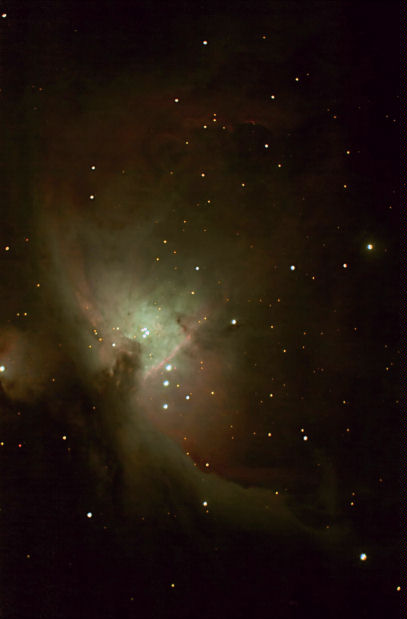
Messier object 42 by K. Massey, Custer Institute

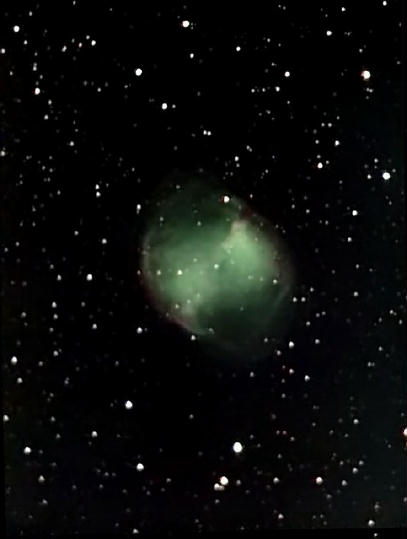
Messier object 27 by K. Massey

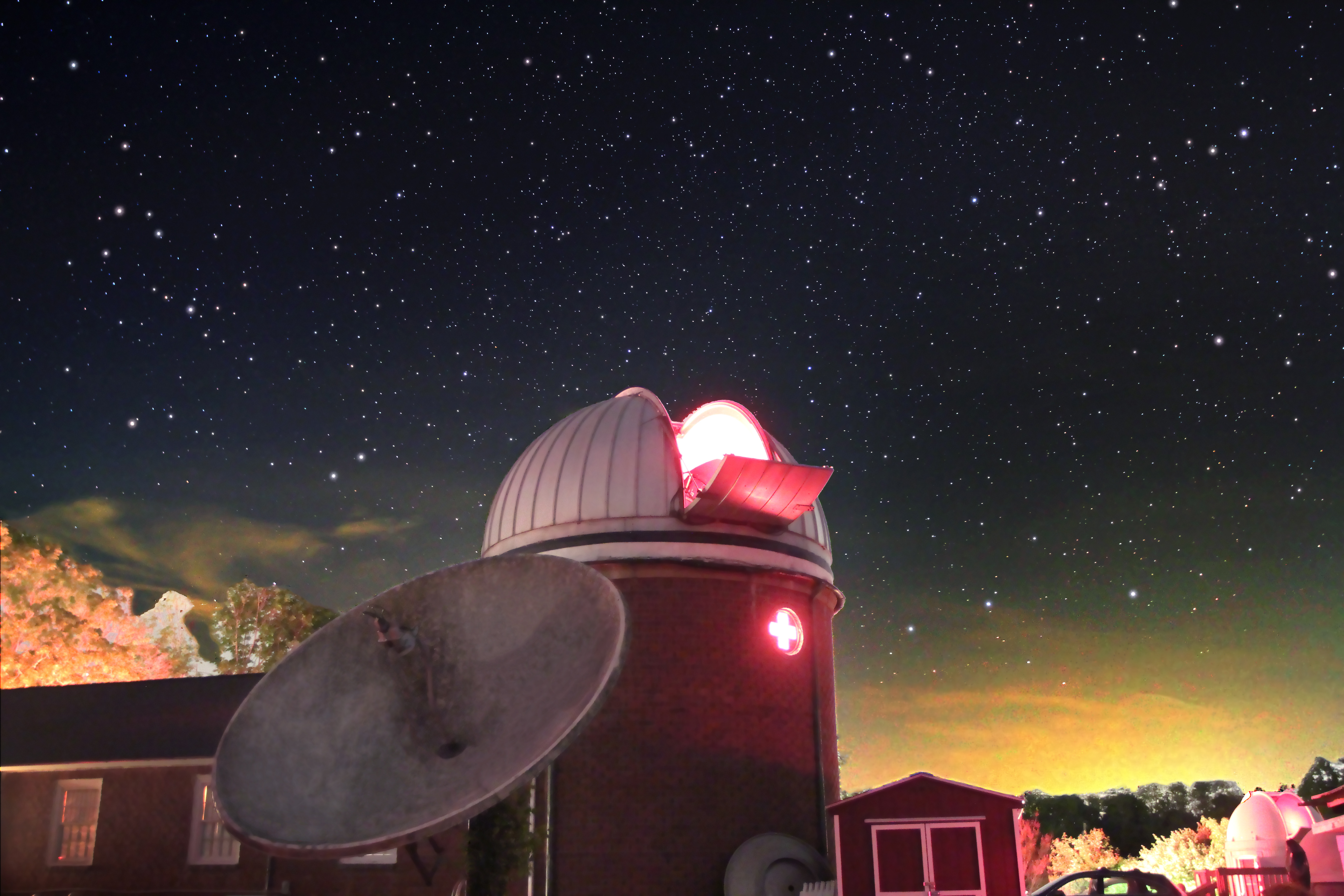
Custer Observatory - Night Sky, Dome and Radio Telescope

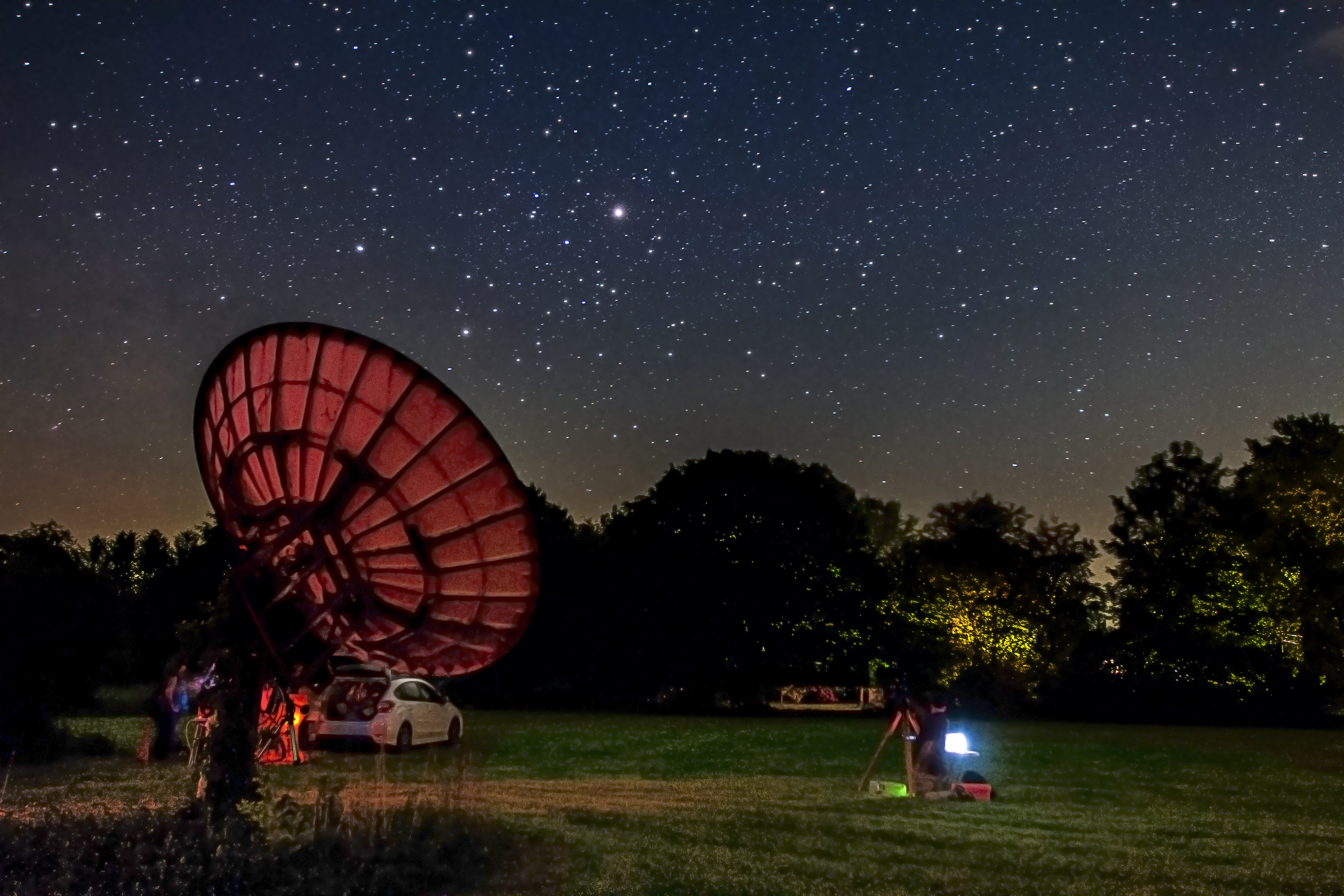
Custer Observatory - Radio Telescope and Jupiter

== See also ==
- List of observatories
