= Kreiken =

Kreiken may refer to:

- Egbert Adriaan Kreiken, Dutch astronomer
- Kreiken Observatory Ankara University
- Kreiken (crater)
