= Lateral Pharma =

Australian biotechnology company

Lateral Pharma Pty Ltd
- Type: Private
- Industry: Biotechnology
- Founded: May 2015
- Headquarters: Melbourne, Victoria, Australia
- Key people: David Kenley (CEO); Andy Gearing (CSO); Stuart Mudge (COO); David Williamson (CFO)
- Website: lateral-pharma.com

Lateral Pharma is a biotechnology company based in Melbourne, Australia focused on developing therapeutics for treatment of neuropathic pain, and neurodegeneration. The company has discovered a range of Stressed Cell Protectant drugs (SCPs) targeting the LanC-like (LanCL) protein family to address these indications.

== History ==
Lateral Pharma was established in May 2015 to repurpose LAT8881, a 16 amino acid C-terminal fragment of hGH, that was previously investigated for the treatment of obesity. It was found to have a good safety profile but ceased development due to failure to show efficacy after oral delivery.

Lateral discovered that LAT8881 was active in rodent models of neuropathy caused by nerve injury, chemotherapy and diabetes, and of pneumonia caused by Influenza A, SARS-CoV-2 and Streptococcus pneumoniae. In 2023, Lateral Pharma completed a human Phase 1b clinical trial demonstrating proof-of-concept for intravenous LAT8881 in treating chronic lumbar radicular pain (sciatica), a common condition that is poorly treated.

Whilst conducting SAR research around LAT8881, Lateral Pharma discovered a portfolio of similar active peptides (SCPs) derived from a total of five mammalian proteins/hormones, including its current lead compound LAT9997, a 6 amino acid fragment of LAT8881 that is suitable for sub-cutaneous administration.

In February 2026, Lateral's work on extending Healthspan was recognized with a silver medal in the Start-up pitch competition at the National University of Singapore Healthy Longevity Conference.

== Products and services ==
LAT9997, which was granted a US patent in December 2025, and Lateral's other SCPs target the LanCL protein family host-protective biological pathway to restore normal cellular function in stressed tissues. LAT9997, a highly soluble linear 6-amino acid peptide, is being investigated for the treatment of sciatica, neuropathic pain, neurodegenerative disorders, pneumonia and other conditions that impact healthy longevity.

LanCL proteins have been implicated in the pathology of multiple diseases of the nervous system, lung, heart and metabolic systems.

LAT9997 has shown efficacy in rodent models of pneumonia, neuropathy, and Alzheimer's disease.

== Operations ==
The company operates from Melbourne and focuses on research and clinical development of drugs that target the LanCL biological pathway. Lateral Pharma runs a semi-virtual operation and collaborates with institutions including the Hudson Institute of Medical Research in Melbourne, Australia and contract research organizations including Evotec. It has conducted human trials in Australia and the United Kingdom. Lateral Pharma has received grant support from the Victorian Medical Research Acceleration Fund in 2023 and Australian government programs for innovation and growth services.
