= Richard Scott Perkin =

- Born: 1906
- Died: 1969 (aged 62–63)
- Occupation: Entrepreneur
- Known for: Co-founder of PerkinElmer
- Spouse: Gladys Frelinghuysen Talmage

Richard Scott Perkin (1906–1969) was an American entrepreneur and one of the cofounders of Perkin-Elmer.

== Life ==
At an early age he developed an interest in astronomy, and began making telescopes and grinding lenses and mirrors. He only spent a year in college studying chemical engineering before he began working at a brokerage firm on Wall Street.

During the 1930s, he met Charles Elmer when the latter was presenting a lecture. The two had a mutual interest in astronomy and decided to go into business together. In 1937, they founded Perkin-Elmer as an optical design and consulting company. Richard served as president of the company until 1960, then became chairman of the board.

The crater Perkin on the Moon was named after him, while Elmer was named after his business partner.

Perkin was married to Gladys Frelinghuysen Talmage who became CEO after he died. A decade later, Gladys commissioned a commemorative history to be written. One hundred copies were printed and distributed to friends.

== See also ==
- List of astronomical instrument makers
