= Ankara University Observatory =

Ankara University Observatory Ankara Üniversitesi Gozlemevi
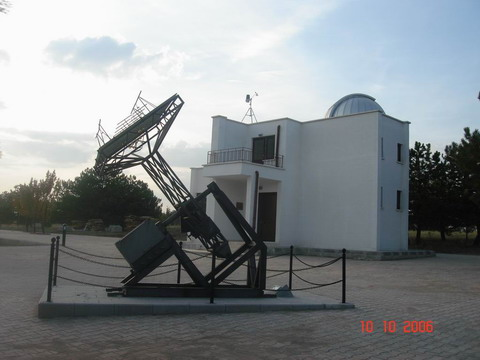
- Organization: Astronomy and Space Sciences Department; Faculty of Science; Ankara University
- Location: Ahlatlıbel, Gölbaşı, Ankara, Turkey
- Coordinates: 39°50′37″N 32°46′38″E
- Altitude: 1,256 m (4,121 ft)
- Established: August 26, 1963
- Website: rasathane.ankara.edu.tr

Telescopes
- T80: 800 mm Ritchey-Chrétien
- T40 Kreiken: 406 mm Reflecting telescope
- T35: 356 mm Reflecting telescope
- T30 Maksutov: Cassegrain
- T15: Coudé
- T20: 203 mm Reflecting telescope
- ETX-125: 127 mm Reflecting telescope
- Mars Explorer: 70 mm Refracting telescope
- TAD-2: 60 mm Refracting telescope
- TAD-1: 60 mm Refracting telescope
- Radio Telescope: Regional radio (defunct)
- Related media on Commons

The Ankara University Observatory (AUG) (Turkish: Ankara Üniversitesi Gözlemevi), is a ground-based astronomical observatory operated by the Astronomy and Space Sciences Department at Ankara University's Faculty of Science. Established in 1959 by Dutch astronomer Egbert Adriaan Kreiken in Ahlatlıbel, Ankara. Currently, it consists of nine optical telescopes and a radio telescope, which is currently taken out of service. Old instruments are displayed in a museum at the observatory.

== History ==
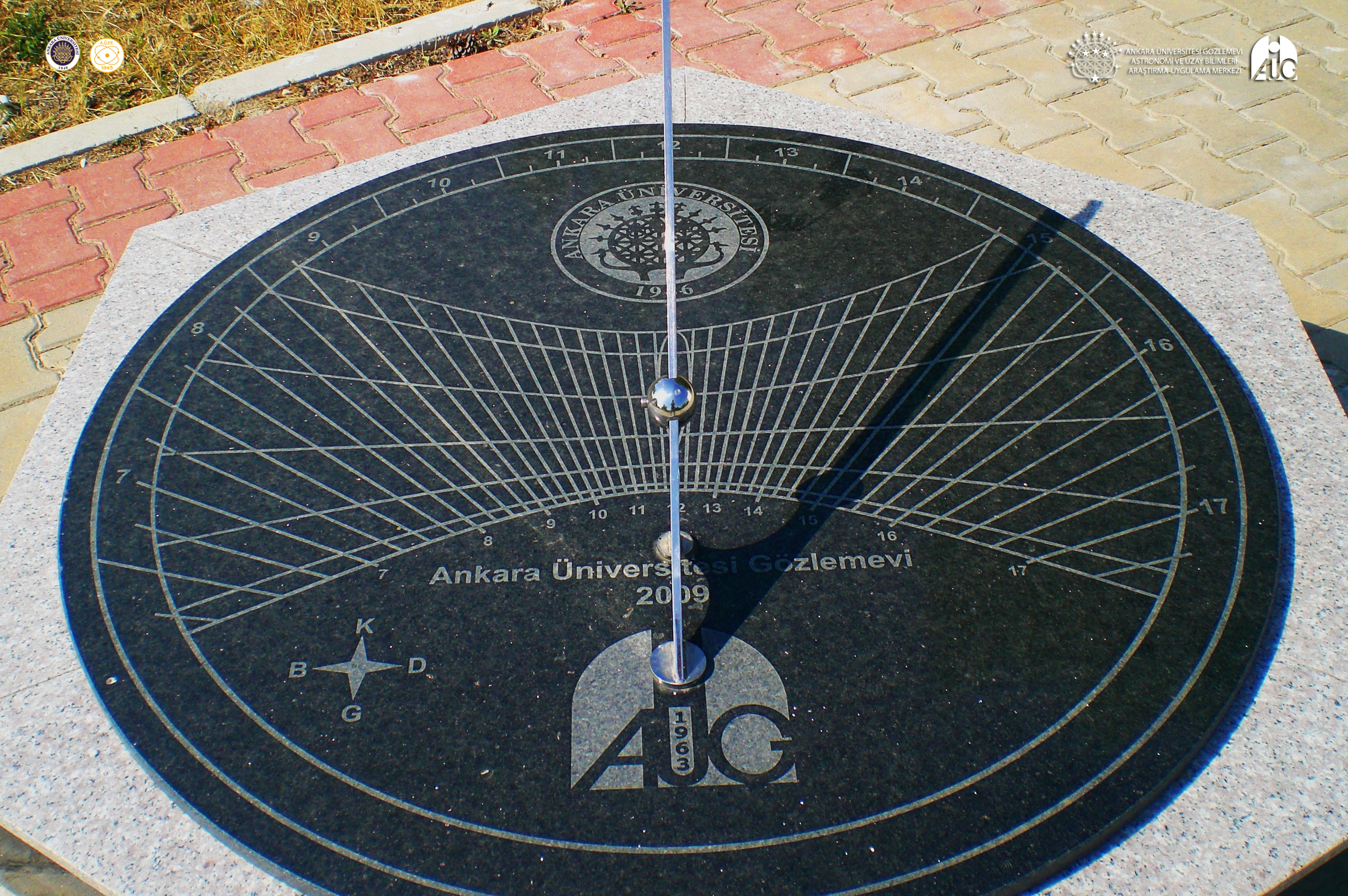
Sundial at the Observatory

Ankara University's Faculty of Science decided in 1954 to establish an observatory to begin with astronomical studies. Ahlatlıbel in Gölbaşı, Ankara was chosen as the ideal site, a location with dark skies far from the city's downtown to avoid the effects of light pollution, having an average 300 clear nights per year and also offering easy transportation from the campus. It is situated 8 km (5.0 mi) south of Ankara at an altitude of 1,256 m (4,121 ft).

Groundbreaking of the main building and the three domes took place in 1959. The observatory was officially inaugurated on August 26, 1963, accompanied by an international astronomy conference. The scientific studies were carried out in the beginning with a radio telescope produced by the Dutch PTT, a 5 cm astrograph, a 15 cm Coudé telescope of Zeiss from Germany for solar observations, a Hilger and Watts microphotometer and a Cuffey Iris photometer.

== Facilities ==
=== Telescopes ===
T40 Kreiken telescope

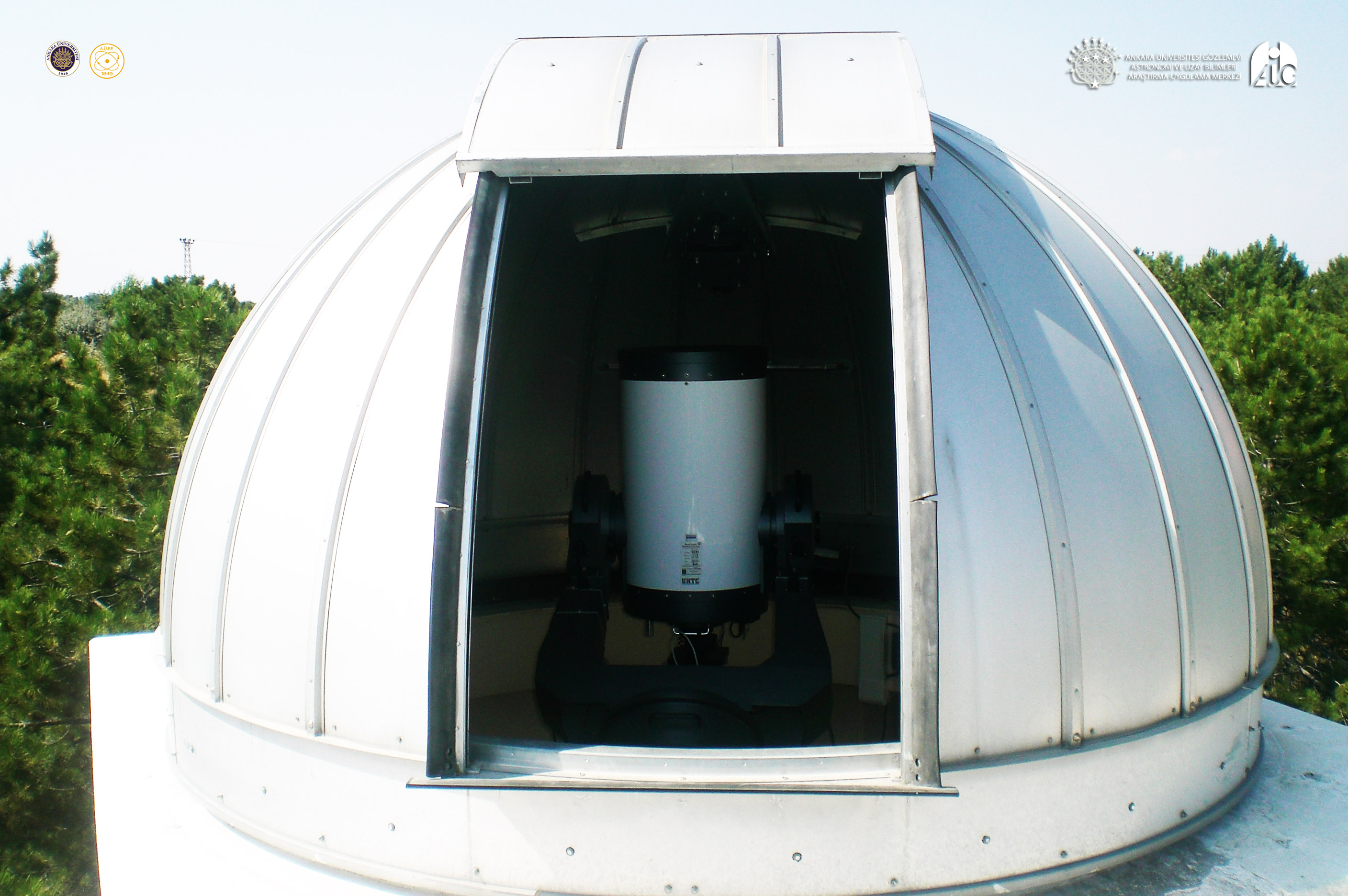
T40 Kreiken telescope and dome

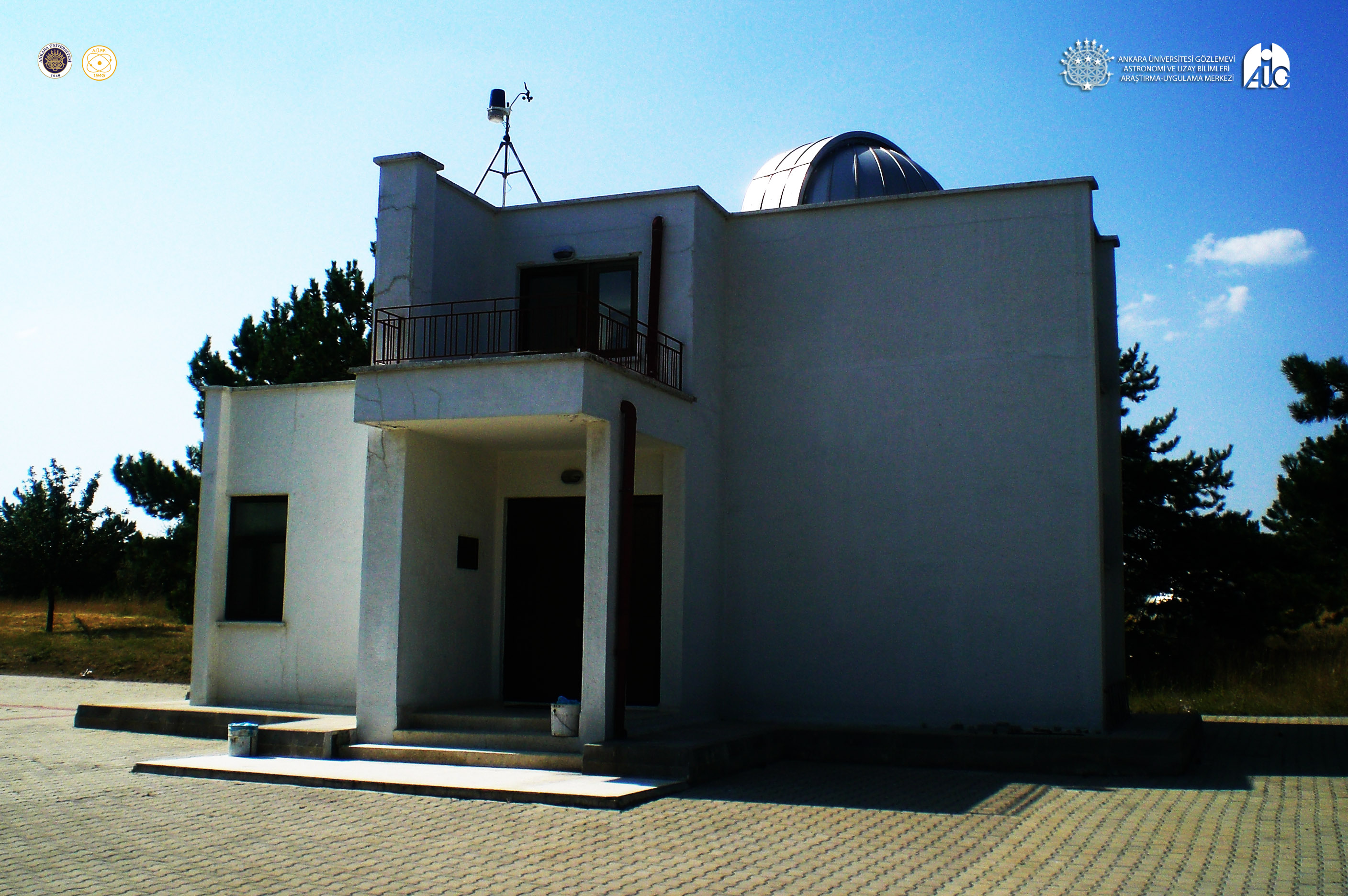
T40 Kreiken telescope building

- Diameter: 406 mm (16")
- Focal ratio: f/10
- Focal length: 4,000 mm
- Image scale: 51 arcsec/mm
- Producer: Meade Instruments Corp., California, USA
- Focal plane instruments: Apogee ALTA U47+ CCD camera, 1024x1024 13 micron pixels E2V CCD47-10 back illuminated ccd chip, PC based data acquisition via USB 2.0 port, OPTEC IFW filter wheel (PC controlled), Johnson UBVRI – Strömgren uvbyHbeta – RGB filters, various eye-pieces.

Named after Egbert Adriaan Kreiken, the founder of the observatory, it is used in general for photoelectric photometry observations on eclipsing binary stars and variable stars.

T35 telescope

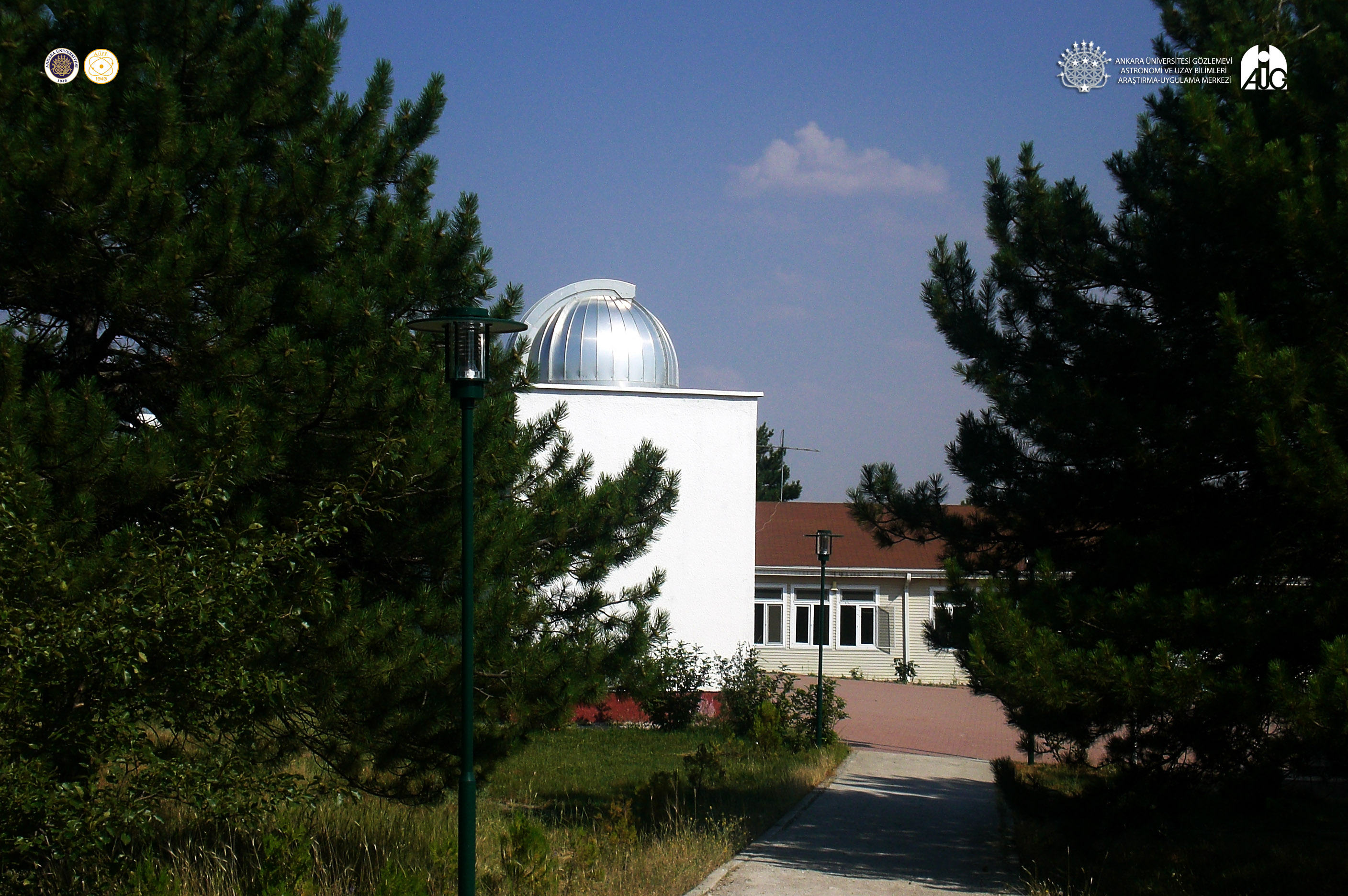
T35 telescope dome

- Diameter: 356 mm (14")
- Focal ratio: f/10
- Focal length: 3,556 mm
- Image scale: 58 arcsec/mm
- Producer: Meade Instruments
- Focal plane instruments : Apogee ALTA U47+ CCD camera, 1024x1024 13 micron pixels E2V CCD47-10 back illuminated ccd chip, PC based data acquisition via USB 2.0 port, OPTEC IFW filter wheel (PC controlled), Johnson UBVRI – Strömgren uvbyHbeta – RGB filters, various eye-pieces.

Installed in the former Maksutov Dome ın 2011, the 356mm telescope is used for observation on binary stars and photoelectric effects of variable stars.

T30 Maksutov telescope

- Diameter: 300 mm
- Focal ratio: f/16
- Focal length: 4,800 mm
- Image scale: 43 arcsec/mm
- Producer : E. Popp Tele-Optik, Zurich, Switzerland
- Focal plane instruments: Optec SSP-5A single channel photoelectric photometer, (containing a Hamamatsu R1414 phototube), standard 1 mm diaphragm, Johnson UBV filters, motorized filter slider, 80386 PC based data acquisition.

300mm telescope for observation on binary stars and photoelectric effects of variable stars.

T15 Coudé telescope

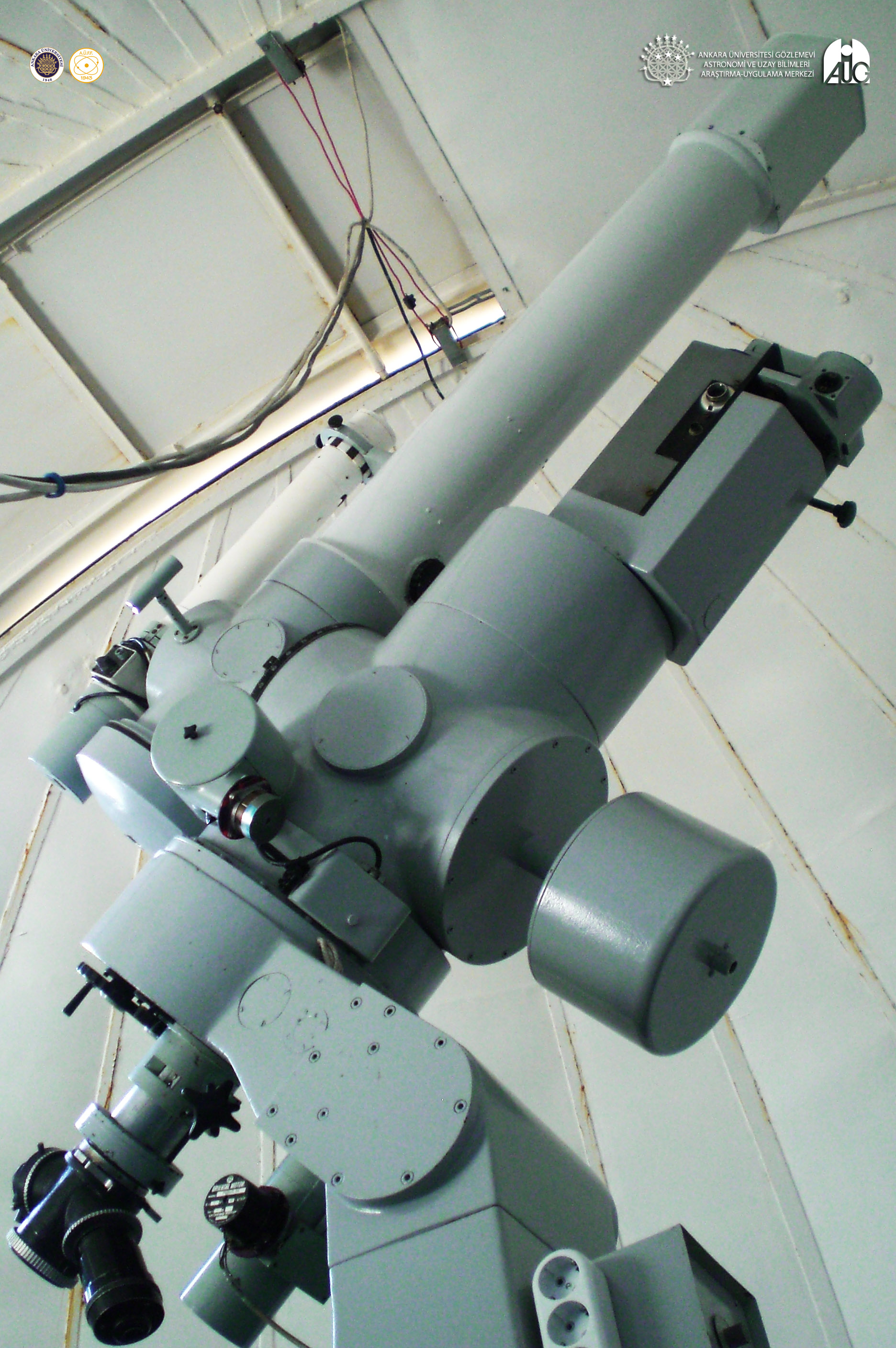
Coudé telescope

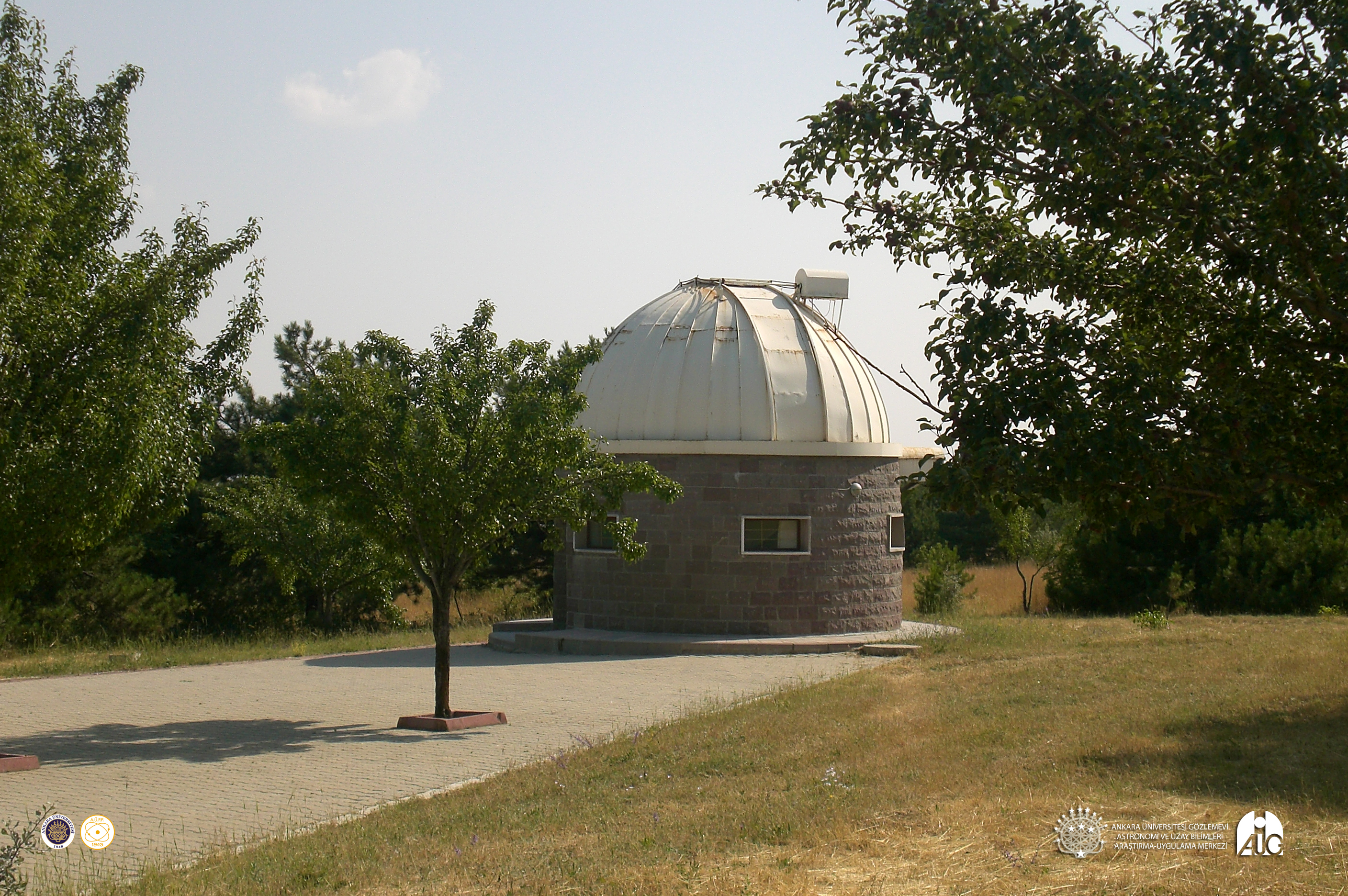
Coudé telescope dome

- Diameter: 150 mm
- Focal ratio: f/15
- Focal length: 2,250 mm
- Image scale: 92 arcsec/mm
- Producer: ZEISS-Oberkochen, Württemberg, Germany
- Focal plane instruments: Solar projection lens and screen for Sun spot observations, Contarex photo camera, Lyott H-alpha monochromator, various filters and eye-pieces.

150mm telescope of type Coudé is used for scientific observation of sun spots. Popular and educational public sessions are held also at this telescope.

Other telescopes

For popular and educational activities open to public:

Meade LX200 8"

- Diameter: 203 mm (8")
- Focal ratio: f/10
- Focal length: 2,000 mm
- Producer: Meade Instruments Corp., California

Meade ETX-125 5"

- Diameter: 127 mm (5")
- Focal ratio: f/15
- Focal length: 1,900 mm
- Image scale: 108 arcsec/mm
- Producer: Meade Instruments
- Focal plane instruments : DSI-2 Color CCD camera

TAD Bresser RB-60 (Two pieces)

- Diameter: 60 mm
- Focal length: 700 mm
- Producer: Meade Instruments

Bresser Mars Explorer ST-70

- Diameter: 70
- Focal ratio: f/10
- Focal length: 700
- Producer: Meade Instruments

Radio telescope

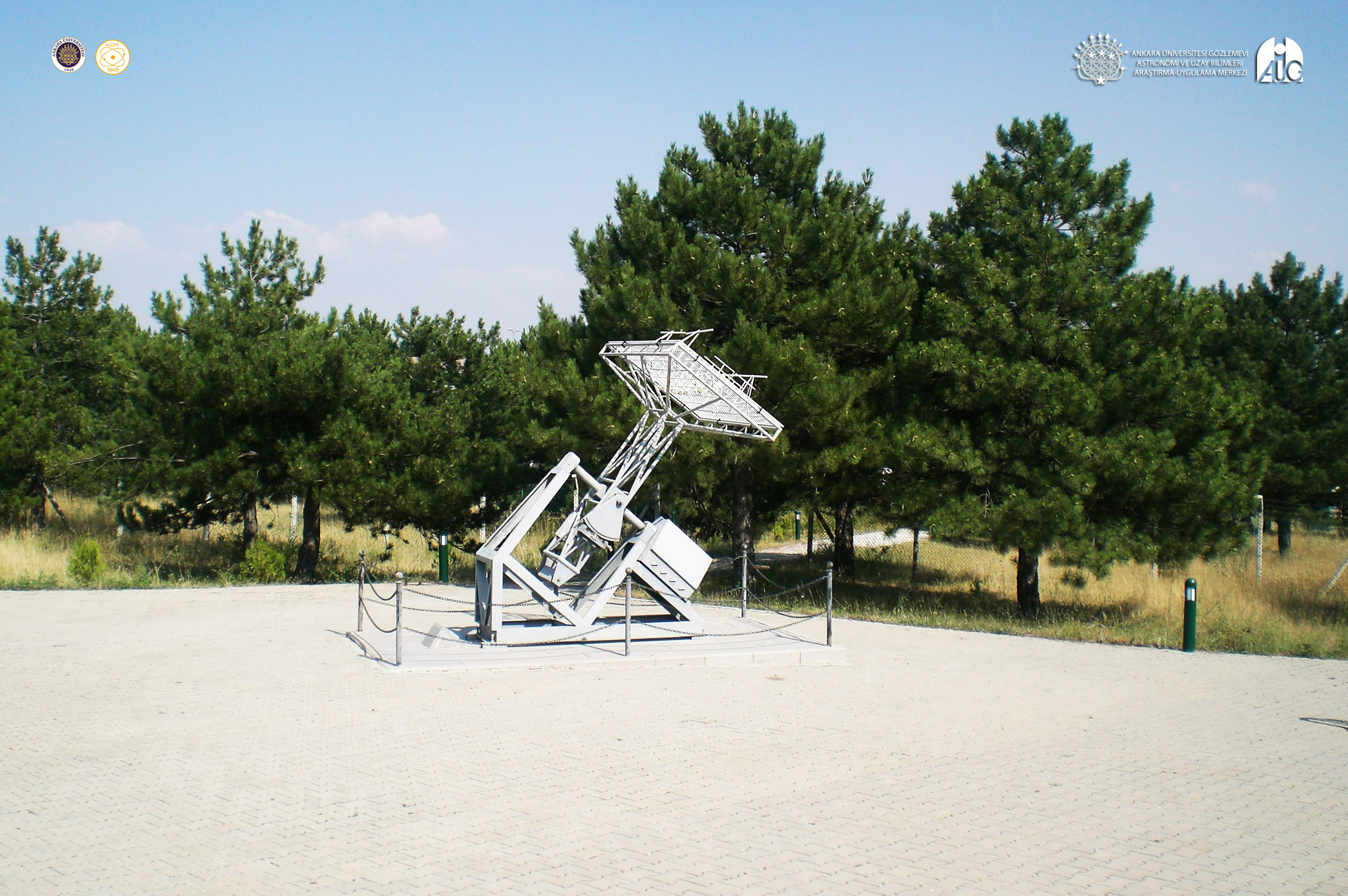
Radio telescope

The radio telescope is not in use anymore.

=== Meteorological station ===
There is a meteorological station for observing atmospheric conditions such as temperature, humidity, barometric pressure, wind speed and wind direction as well as precipitation amounts. The gathered data is published also on the internet every five minutes.

== Transportation ==
The observatory is in Ahlatlıbel on İncek Blvd., at a distance of 2 km (1.2 mi) from Or-An Bridge (Konya Road) and can be reached by public transportation:

- From Güvenpark in Kızılay, Ankara with lines 190, 191, 192 and 194
- From Bentderesi in Ulus, Ankara with Dolmuş
