= Spectral Genomics =

Spectral Genomics, Inc.
- Company type: Private, acquired by PerkinElmer in 2006
- Industry: Health Sciences
- Founded: 2000
- Headquarters: Houston, TX
- Key people: Robert Johnson Ph.D., CEO, and President; Keith Steward Ph.D., Director Informatics, Brandon Perthuis, Director Sales
- Products: Genetic Screening tools

Spectral Genomics, Inc. was a technology spin-off company from Baylor College of Medicine, selling aCGH microarrays and related software.

== History ==
The company was founded in February 2000 by BCM technologies. Spectral licensed technology invented by its founders Alan Bradley, Ph.D., Wei-wen Cai, Ph.D.. The company raised $3.0 million in the first financing round in August 2001. In March 2004 the company raised additional $9.4 million in its second financing round. In March 2005, GE Healthcare became the exclusive distributor for Spectral Genomics's products outside of North America. Spectral Genomics was acquired by PerkinElmer in May 2006, ending GE's distribution agreement.
