= BioLegend =

American biotechnology company

- Type: Subsidiary
- Industry: Biotechnology
- Founded: 2002
- Headquarters: San Diego, California, U.S.
- Area served: Worldwide
- Key people: Gene Lay, D.V.M., Founder and CEO
- Products: Antibodies, ELISA Kits and Sets, Recombinant Proteins, Custom Assay Development, Buffers and Solutions
- Parent: Revvity
- Website: biolegend.com

BioLegend is a global developer and manufacturer of antibodies and reagents used in biomedical research located in San Diego, California. It was incorporated in June 2002 and has since expanded to include BioLegend Japan KK, where it is partnered with Tomy Digital Biology Co., Ltd. in Tokyo, BioLegend Europe in the United Kingdom, BioLegend GmbH in Germany, and BioLegend UK Ltd in the United Kingdom. In July 2021, BioLegend was acquired by PerkinElmer for $5.25 billion and now operates as Revvity. BioLegend manufactures products in the areas of neuroscience, cell immunophenotyping, cytokines and chemokines, adhesion, cancer research, T regulatory cells, stem cells, innate immunity, cell-cycle analysis, apoptosis, and modification-specific antibodies. Reagents are created for use in flow cytometry, proteogenomics, ELISA, immunoprecipitation, Western blotting, immunofluorescence microscopy, immunohistochemistry, and in vitro or in vivo functional assays.

== History ==
BioLegend was founded by CEO, Gene Lay, D.V.M., who was also the co-founder of PharMingen. In 2011, BioLegend co-developed and introduced Brilliant Violet(TM)-conjugated antibodies, using a novel fluorophore based on Nobel Prize-winning chemistry developed by Sirigen. In 2018, BioLegend introduced TotalSeq™ antibody-oligonucleotide conjugates for use in single cell proteogenomics analysis. BioLegend continued expansion and moved into a new 8-acre campus at BioLegend Way in 2019 with state of the art facilities designed to accommodate up to 1000 employees.
