= Elmer (crater) =

Crater on the Moon

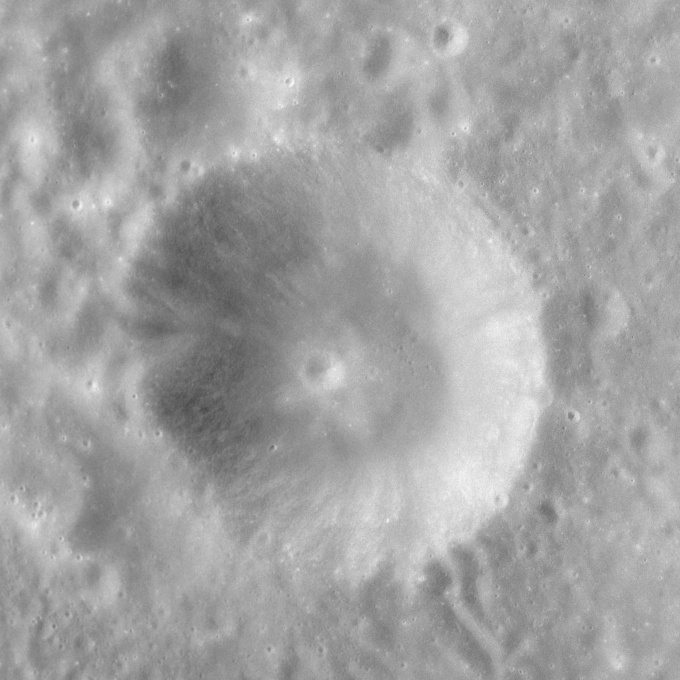
- Apollo 12 image
- Coordinates: 10.23°S 84.18°E
- Diameter: 16.86 km (10.48 mi)
- Depth: Unknown
- Colongitude: 276° at sunrise
- Eponym: Charles W. Elmer

Elmer is a small lunar impact crater that is located to the south of Mare Smythii, near the eastern limb of the Moon. This crater is seen at a highly oblique angle from Earth, and the visibility is affected by libration. Elmer lies southwest of the crater Kreiken, and east-southeast of the larger Dale. This is a circular, bowl-shaped crater with an interior floor that occupies about half the total diameter.

The crater was named after Charles Wesley Elmer, an amateur astronomer and the co-founder of the PerkinElmer optical company. Its designation was formally adopted by the International Astronomical Union in 1976.
