= Caliper Life Sciences =

Defunct American life science products company

- Type: Public
- Traded as: Nasdaq: CALP
- Industry: Biotechnology
- Founded: 1995
- Defunct: 2011
- Fate: Acquired
- Successor: PerkinElmer
- Headquarters: Hopkinton, Massachusetts, United States
- Area served: Worldwide
- Products: Pharmaceuticals, Life Sciences tools
- Website: www.caliperls.com

Caliper Life Sciences was an American company that produced products and services for life sciences research. The firm, founded in 1995, was based in Hopkinton, Massachusetts, with direct sales, service and application-support operations in countries around the globe.

The firm's products include instruments, software and reagents, laboratory automation tools microfluidics, lab automation and liquid handling, optical imaging technologies, and services for drug discovery and drug development.

The company was acquired by PerkinElmer in 2011.

== History ==
Caliper Life Sciences was founded in 1995 by Larry Bock and Drs. Michael Knapp, Michael Ramsey and Andreas Manz. as Caliper Technologies, with a focus on microfluidics technology. In 2003, the firm acquired Zymark, a company with a focus in laboratory automation and robotics, and was renamed Caliper Life Sciences.

In October 2005, it acquired NovaScreen Biosciences Corporation a privately held CRO offering pre-clinical drug discovery and development services. In August 2006, it acquired Xenogen Corporation, a developer of in vivo optical imaging systems (IVIS systems) and its division, Xenogen Biosciences, a CRO offering in vivo transgenic animal production, phenotyping, gene targeting and in vivo optical imaging services, which was subsequently acquired by Taconic.

At the end of October 2008, SOTAX, a tester and software developer of medical devices, acquired Caliper's Pharmaceutical Development & Quality Analysis (PDQ) Division for $15.8 Million. On November 10, 2008, Caliper's Auto Trace(r) line of product was acquired by Dionex. In December 2009, Taconic Biosciences acquired XenoGen Biosciences' in vivo pre-clinical CRO, a subsidiary of Caliper Life Sciences. A year later, in December 2010, Caliper purchased Cambridge Research & Instrumentation Inc. for ~$20 million in a cash and stock deal.

In September 2011, PerkinElmer agreed to buy Caliper Life Sciences for $600 million. On November 7, 2011, PerkinElmer completed the acquisition of Caliper Life Sciences for a total net purchase price of approximately $600 million in cash.

== Products ==
=== Microfluidic platform ===
Caliper researched and produced microfluidic lab-on-a-chip technology, used for drug screening and profiling and for DNA, RNA and protein analysis.

=== Optical imaging ===
Through its acquisition of Xenogen Corporation in 2006, the firm developed of in vivo biophotonic imaging technology, producing both biophotonic and fluorescent imaging technologies.

=== Lab automation ===
The firm produced other robotic systems is to automate solid phase extraction and several liquid handling and plate management systems to automate drug discovery and development.

=== Discovery outsourcing ===
Caliper's Discovery Alliances & Services division (CDAS) was created from the acquisitions of NovaScreen, a provider of in vitro & in vivo discovery services. The in vitro service arm of CDAS included in vitro drug discovery and development, including screening assays to define the mode of action, side effect profiles, selectivity, and other relevant activities of drug candidates. In vivo capabilities included: non-invasive in vivo optical imaging, OncoMouse studies, and in vivo compound evaluations for safety assessment and drug repositioning.
