= Egbert Adriaan Kreiken =

Dutch astronomer

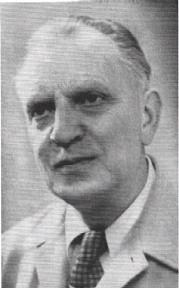
Egbert Adriaan Kreiken

Egbert Adriaan Kreiken (1 November 1896, Barneveld, Gelderland – 16 August 1964) was a Dutch teacher and astronomer.

He was born at Barneveld in the Netherlands, to a family of teachers. After being awarded his Ph.D. in 1923, he would become a professor of astronomy in Amsterdam.

For most of his life he served as an educator, working in Indonesia, Liberia, and Turkey. While he was in Indonesia he served as that nation's Minister of Education. He became the director of the astronomy institute in Turkey, after moving there in 1954. He would help found the Ankara University Observatory.

Over a forty-year career he would publish a number of papers on astronomy, including studies of stars and stellar systems. He died in 1964 as the result of a painful ailment.

The crater Kreiken on the Moon is named after him.
