= Revvity =

American biotechnology company

Revvity, Inc.
- Formerly: PerkinElmer, Inc.
- Type: Public
- Traded as: NYSE: RVTY; S&P 500 component
- Industry: Biotechnology
- Founded: May 9, 2023; 3 years ago in Waltham, Massachusetts, U.S.
- Headquarters: Waltham, Massachusetts, U.S.
- Key people: Prahlad Singh (President and CEO)
- Products: Technologies and services for life sciences research, drug discovery and diagnostics, including reagents and consumables; laboratory instruments and automation; cell and gene perturbation, genomic and proteomic analysis, screening and imaging technologies; scientific software and informatics; in-vitro diagnostic products for newborn screening, maternal and fetal health, autoimmune and infectious diseases; and laboratory, clinical and biopharmaceutical services.
- Revenue: ▲US$2.9 billion (2025)
- Net income: ▼US$241 million (2025)
- Total assets: ▼US$12.2 billion (2025)
- Total equity: ▼US$7.25 billion (2025)
- Number of employees: 11,000 (2025)
- Subsidiaries: BioLegend; Euroimmun; Tulip Diagnostics; ViaCord
- Website: revvity.com

Revvity, Inc. is a multinational company headquartered in Waltham, Massachusetts, USA, in the life sciences and diagnostics business that is focused on selling to the pharmaceutical and biotechnology industries, especially in relation to approaches making use of new cell therapy or gene therapy developments. Its origins lie with the long-existing company PerkinElmer, which has been in a variety of business lines.

In 2022, a split of PerkinElmer resulted in one part, comprising its applied, food and enterprise services businesses, being sold to the private equity firm New Mountain Capital for $2.45 billion and thus no longer being public but keeping the PerkinElmer name. The other part, comprising the life sciences and diagnostics businesses, remained public but required a new name, which in 2023 was announced as Revvity, Inc. From the perspective of Revvity, the goal of creating a separate company was that its businesses might show greater profit margins and more in the way of growth potential. An associated goal was to have more financial flexibility moving forward. On May 16, 2023, the PerkinElmer stock symbol PKI was replaced by the new symbol RVTY.

The name 'Revvity' itself was formed from a combination of the words "revolution" (abrupt change, in English) and "vita" (life, in Latin). It was the larger of the two splitees of around 17,000 employees of the public PerkinElmer, about 11,000 of them were assigned to it, while some 6,000 went to the newly private PerkinElmer. Initial annual revenues for Revvity were estimated at $3 billion. Singh and some other senior executives came to Revvity from PerkinElmer, while others were new hires. Headquarters for Revvity were kept in the same town as the old PerkinElmer, that being Waltham, Massachusetts.

Compared with its PerkinElmer past, Revvity was de-emphasizing instruments in favor of an approach based on reagents and electronic commerce.

== Regulatory Approvals ==
In June 2023, Revvity's Euroimmun business received CE-IVDR certification for the UNIQO 160, an automated indirect immunofluorescence testing (IIFT) system that integrates sample preparation, incubation, slide washing and mounting, image acquisition, and image analysis.

In November 2023, Revvity's EONIS Q system received CE-IVD certification for molecular newborn screening of spinal muscular atrophy (SMA) and severe combined immunodeficiency (SCID).

In January 2025, Revvity’s Euroimmun received 510(k) clearance from the U.S. Food and Drug Administration (FDA) for its automated chemiluminescence-based immunoassay (ChLIA) free testosterone test, providing direct quantitative measurement of free testosterone levels used to aid the diagnosis of androgen disorders. In May 2026, Revvity’s subsidiary, Immunodiagnostic Systems (IDS), received clearance from the FDA for a total testosterone ChLIA test, complementing the company’s existing FDA-cleared ChLIA tests for free testosterone and sex hormone-binding globulin (SHBG). Together, these clearances enable first- and second-line diagnostic testing capabilities for suspected hypogonadism in men on a single automated platform.

In March 2025, Revvity’s Euroimmun received CE marking for the Anti-Measles Virus ELISA 2.0 (IgG), a measles antibody detection assay to support the diagnosis of a measles virus infection or to determine the immune status against measles virus.

In April 2025, Revvity received FDA approval for the Auto-Pure 2400 liquid handling platform in combination with the T-SPOT.TB test for automated latent tuberculosis detection.

In May 2025, Revvity’s Euroimmun launched the IDS i20 analytical random access platform, enabling full automation of chemiluminescence immunoassays (ChLIA). The CE-marked and FDA-listed device allows laboratories to consolidate multiple specialty tests on a single instrument, processing specialty assays in endocrinology, allergy, autoimmune and infectious diseases, Alzheimer’s disease, and therapeutic drug monitoring.

== Collaborations ==
In May 2023, Revvity announced a non-exclusive licensing agreement with AstraZeneca that provided access to Revvity's Pin-point base editing technology for AstraZeneca's cell therapy research in cancer and immune-mediated diseases.

In April 2024, Revvity partnered with the Research Triangle Institute (RTI International) to provide genome sequencing for Early Check, a voluntary newborn screening research study in North Carolina. The study offers free genomic testing for hundreds of childhood-onset genetic conditions beyond those included in standard newborn screening programs.

In November 2024, Revvity's BioLegend business and Scale Biosciences announced the launch of the TotalSeq Phenocyte single-cell protein profiling solution, a product for high-parameter protein profiling of single cells intended for immunology and oncology research.

In January 2025, Revvity and Element Biosciences announced an agreement to commercialize an in vitro diagnostic workflow for neonatal sequencing. The companies stated that the workflow builds on their previous collaboration in sequencing-based newborn testing.

In March 2025, Revvity announced an expanded collaboration with Genomics England to support genomics initiatives, including the Generation Study, a program screening up to 100,000 newborns for more than 200 rare genetic disorders. The study is intended to evaluate the potential use of whole-genome sequencing in newborn screening.

In September 2025, Revvity announced a collaboration with Profluent to combine Profluent's AI-engineered enzymes with Revvity's Pin-point base editing platform for research applications in base editing.

In October 2025, Revvity, in collaboration with Sanofi, announced a program to expand its type 1 diabetes offering to include a population-scale assay for early detection.

In November 2025, Revvity and the Medical Device Innovation Consortium (MDIC), through the Somatic Reference Samples (SRS) Initiative, announced the launch of new somatic cancer reference standards to monitor diagnostic assay accuracy.

In January 2026, Revvity and Eli Lilly and Company (Lilly) announced a collaboration to make Lilly TuneLab available through Revvity's Signals Xynthetica platform to create a scalable, federated framework designed to support AI-enabled drug discovery workflows.

In July 2026, Revvity Signals Software business announced it joined Anthropic's directory for Model Context Protocol (MCP) connectors, enabling scientists to access Signals AI capabilities through Claude, including Claude Science, helping researchers interact with connected R&D knowledge.
