= Charles Elmer =

American amateur astronomer

Charles Wesley Elmer (1872–1954) was an American amateur astronomer and court reporter who co-founded the Perkin-Elmer optical company in 1937.

He was born in New York City, and for most of his life he was employed as a court reporter. However, as a hobby he developed a strong interest in astronomy and optical telescopes. In 1936, he met Richard S. Perkin, and the two decided to form an optical business in New York. This would grow to become the Perkin-Elmer optical company, which was officially incorporated on April 19, 1937. Charles Elmer served as the secretary-treasurer of the Perkin-Elmer company until he retired in 1949.

He was married to May Custer, the grand niece of General George Armstrong Custer. In 1943, he was awarded the Merit Award by the American Association of Variable Star Observers for his "long continued service and devotion to the activities of the Association". The crater Elmer on the Moon is named after him, as is the asteroid 2493 Elmer.
