= Kreiken (crater) =

Crater on the Moon

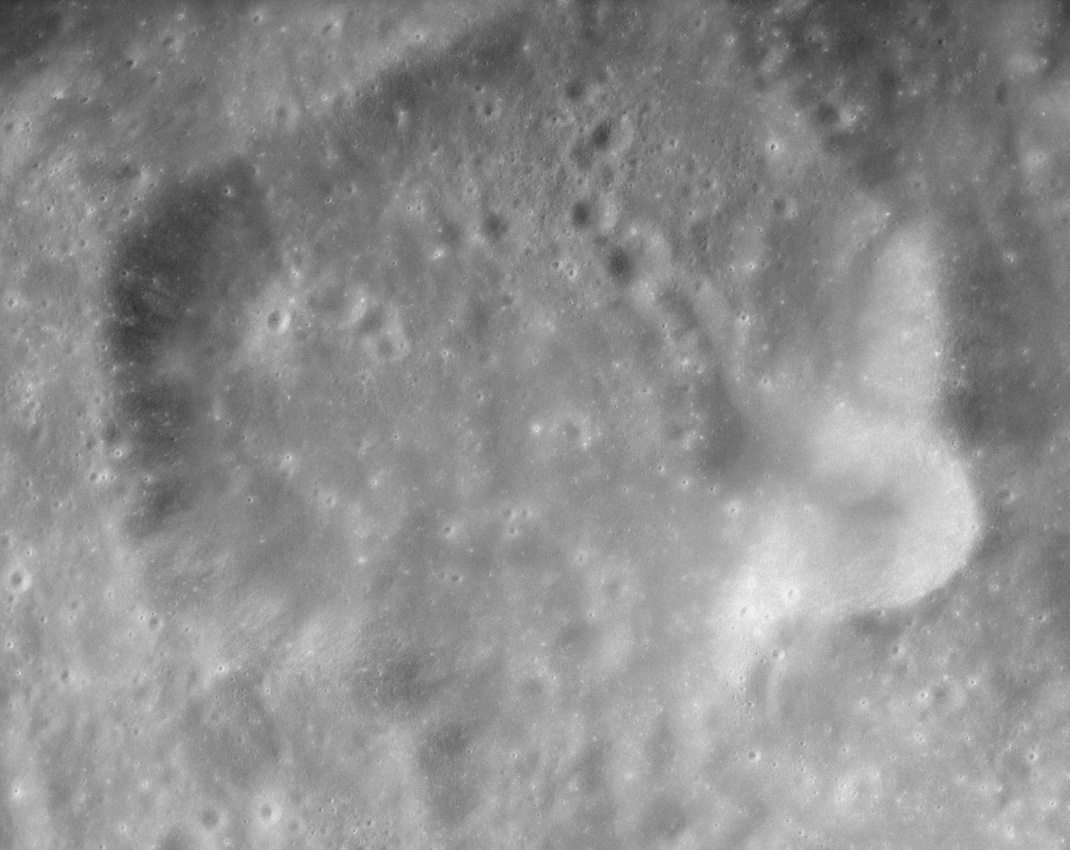
- Apollo 12 image
- Coordinates: 9.05°S 84.55°E
- Diameter: 29.37 km (18.25 mi)
- Depth: Unknown
- Colongitude: 276° at sunrise
- Eponym: Egbert A. Kreiken

Kreiken is a small lunar impact crater that is located near the eastern limb of the Moon. It lies to the south of the crater Kiess and the Mare Smythii. Just to the south-southwest is the smaller crater Elmer, and to the west is Dale.

Only the western part of this crater's rim survives nearly intact, the remainder forming a faint outline on the surface. There is a small crater lying across eastern rim. The interior floor is unremarkable, with no features of interest.

The crater was named by the IAU in 1973 after Dutch astronomer Egbert Adriaan Kreiken.
