= Evotec =

German biopharmaceutical company

Evotec SE
- Company type: Public
- Traded as: FWB: EVT; FWB: EVTA (ADR); WBAG: EVT; Nasdaq: EVO (ADR); MDAX component (FWB: EVT)
- ISIN: DE0005664809; US30050E1055
- Industry: Biotechnology, contract research organization
- Founded: 1993; 33 years ago
- Founder: Manfred Eigen
- Headquarters: Hamburg, Germany
- Key people: Dr. Christian Wojczewski (CEO); Iris Löw-Friedrich (chairwoman of the Supervisory Board)
- Revenue: 618 million € (2021)
- Number of employees: >4,200 (2021)
- Website: evotec.com

Evotec SE is a publicly listed drug discovery and development company headquartered in Hamburg, Germany. The company operates globally, largely through external alliances with pharmaceutical and biotechnology companies, academic institutions, patient advocacy groups, and venture capitalists. As of 31 December 2021 Evotec had a market capitalization of €7.5 billion and a pipeline of more than 130 partnered programs in discovery, pre-clinical development and clinical development.

The company's 4,200+ employees work across a number of therapeutic areas including CNS/neurology (e.g. Alzheimer's disease, Huntington's disease), metabolic diseases (e.g. Diabetes), Cancer, and inflammatory and infectious diseases. It has long-term discovery alliances with Bristol Myers Squibb, Bayer, Sanofi, Boehringer Ingelheim, the CHDI Foundation, Lilly, Takeda, Sernova, and more.

On 28 October 2009 the company was listed on the TecDAX index, which tracks the performance of the 30 largest German companies from the technology sector. On 24 September 2018 Evotec joined the MDAX index, following a rule change that enabled dual listing. The MDAX tracks 60 Prime Standard shares from sectors excluding technology. On 8 November 2021, Evotec completed its secondary listing on the U.S. Nasdaq stock exchange on November 8 and raised $500 million.

== Company formation ==
Evotec SE was established as Evotec BioSystems GmbH in 1993 by a group of founders that included Karsten Henco, Ulrich Aldag, Freimut Leidenberger, Heinrich Schulte, Rudolf Rigler, Charles Weissmann and Nobel Laureate Manfred Eigen. Eigen won the 1967 Nobel Prize in Chemistry for his work measuring ultrafast chemical reactions.

Evotec Biosystems went public in 1999, listing on the Frankfurt Stock Exchange under the ticker symbol EVT. The following year, it merged with the British chemical services company Oxford Asymmetry International plc, adopting the new name Evotec OAI.

In 2002, the company was divided into two business divisions; "Discovery and Development Services" and "Tools and Technologies," creating the wholly owned subsidiary Evotec Technologies GmbH. Four years later, this division was sold to PerkinElmer in a move that, according to Evotec, allowed it to focus its resources towards the discovery and development of new pharmaceutical drugs. The company later rebranded as Evotec AG in 2005, with an aim to "reflect the growing emphasis of proprietary drug development in its business model and have a single "new" name which stands for both parts of its business."

== Notable acquisitions ==
In 2008, Evotec acquired US-based Renovis in a $152 million stock deal, allowing it to list on the Nasdaq stock exchange. One year later, the company announced it was voluntarily de-listing its American Depositary Receipt to cut costs and concentrate its share trading on the German TecDAX platform.

In 2010, the company acquired DeveloGen AG, a spin-out from the Max Planck Institute for Biophysical Chemistry that was developing novel therapies for metabolic disorders, such as diabetes.

In 2011, Evotec acquired Kinaxo Biotechnologies GmbH, a Munich-based, privately owned biotech company. Kinaxo specialized in chemical proteomics and its application in small molecule drug discovery. That same year, Evotec took control of Compound Focus the compound management arm of the Galapagos group subsidiary Biofocus.

In January 2013, Evotec acquired CCS Cell Culture Service GmbH, a Hamburg-based company that supplied custom cells and cell-based reagents for drug discovery applications.

In May 2014, Evotec acquired Euprotec for $3.15 million, a contract research organization (CRO) with expertise in infectious diseases and respiratory biology.

In December 2016, Evotec completed its acquisition of Cyprotex, a preclinical contract research organization.

In July 2017, Evotec acquired the integrated drug development services provider Aptuit for €256 million.

In recent years, Evotec has made two significant deals with French pharmaceutical company Sanofi. In 2015, Evotec took over Sanofi's small-molecule drug development site in Toulouse, France, bringing approximately 200 Sanofi chemists into its team. In 2018, Evotec acquired Sanofi's infectious disease unit, absorbing an additional 100 Sanofi employees and a majority of its anti-infectives research portfolio, including more than 10 R&D assets. Per the agreement, Evotec will continue to run infectious disease R&D operations in Lyon, France. Evotec's initial focus will be on antimicrobial resistance ("AMR") and superbug infections, tuberculosis, and malaria, as well as the creation of novel antiviral therapies with new mechanisms of action.

In April 2019, Evotec AG announced it had completed its conversion into a company under European law (Societas Europaea, "SE"). It officially adopted the legal name Evotec SE, with its registration in the commercial register of the District Court of Hamburg.

In May 2020, the company announced its acquisition of Just Biologics, a U.S.-based biologics company previously backed by the Gates Foundation.

In June 2020, Evotec and two investment partners – Samsara BioCapital and KCK Ltd. – announced the launch of Autobahn Labs, a virtual incubator for early-stage research programs, headquartered in Palo Alto, California.

In May 2022, Evotec announced the company are set to acquire Italy-based cell technology firm Rigenerand. The deal worth $24.5 million will include Evotec EVOcells cell therapy platform to Rigenerand's cGMP.
