= PerkinElmer =

American corporation focused on life science research

PerkinElmer, Inc.
- Type: Private
- Traded as: NYSE: PKI (until 2023)
- Industry: Medtech
- Founded: 1937; 89 years ago
- Headquarters: Shelton, Connecticut, U.S. (2023)
- Key people: Dirk Bontridder, Chief Executive Officer Rosemary Pitts, Chief Financial Officer
- Products: Provides end-to-end discovery, measurement & testing solutions and specialized Pharma services (analytical solutions for applied markets, pharma services, food quality & safety solutions, omics sample prep solutions).
- Revenue: Not communicated
- Owner: New Mountain Capital
- Number of employees: ~5000
- Website: www.perkinelmer.com

PerkinElmer, Inc., previously styled Perkin-Elmer, is an American global corporation that was founded in 1937 and originally focused on precision optics. Over the years it went into and out of several different businesses via acquisitions and divestitures; these included defense products, semiconductors, computer systems, and others. By the 21st century, PerkinElmer was focused in the business areas of diagnostics, life science research, food, environmental and industrial testing. Its capabilities include detection, imaging, informatics, and service. It produced analytical instruments, genetic testing and diagnostic tools, medical imaging components, software, instruments, and consumables for multiple end markets. PerkinElmer was part of the S&P 500 Index and operated in 190 countries.

Over its history, PerkinElmer has been split in two twice. In 1999, PerkinElmer merged with EG&G, with the ongoing Analytical Instruments Division of Perkin-Elmer keeping that name, while the life sciences division of the company became the separate PE Corporation. In 2022, a split of PerkinElmer resulted in one part, comprising applied, food and enterprise services businesses, being sold to the private equity firm New Mountain Capital for $2.45 billion and thus no longer being public but kept the PerkinElmer name. The other part, comprising life sciences and diagnostics businesses, remained public but required a new name, which in 2023 was announced as Revvity, Inc.

== History ==
=== Founding ===
Richard Perkin was attending the Pratt Institute in Brooklyn to study chemical engineering, but left after a year to try his hand on Wall Street. Still interested in the sciences, he gave public lectures on various topics. Charles Elmer ran a firm that supplied court reporters and was nearing retirement when he attended one of Perkin's lectures on astronomy being held at the Brooklyn Institute of Arts and Sciences.

The two struck up a friendship over their shared interest in astronomy, and eventually came up with the idea of starting a firm to produce precision optics. Perkin raised US$15,000 from his relatives, while Elmer added US$5,000, and the firm was initially set up as a partnership on 19 April 1937. Initially, they worked from a small office in Manhattan, but soon opened a production facility in Jersey City. They incorporated the growing firm on 13 December 1939. A further move to Glenbrook in Connecticut in 1941 was quickly followed by another move to Norwalk, Connecticut, where the company remained until 2000. The opening of World War II led to significant expansion as the company produced optics for range finders, bombsights, and reconnaissance systems. This work led to the U.S. Navy awarding them the first "E" for Excellence award in 1942.

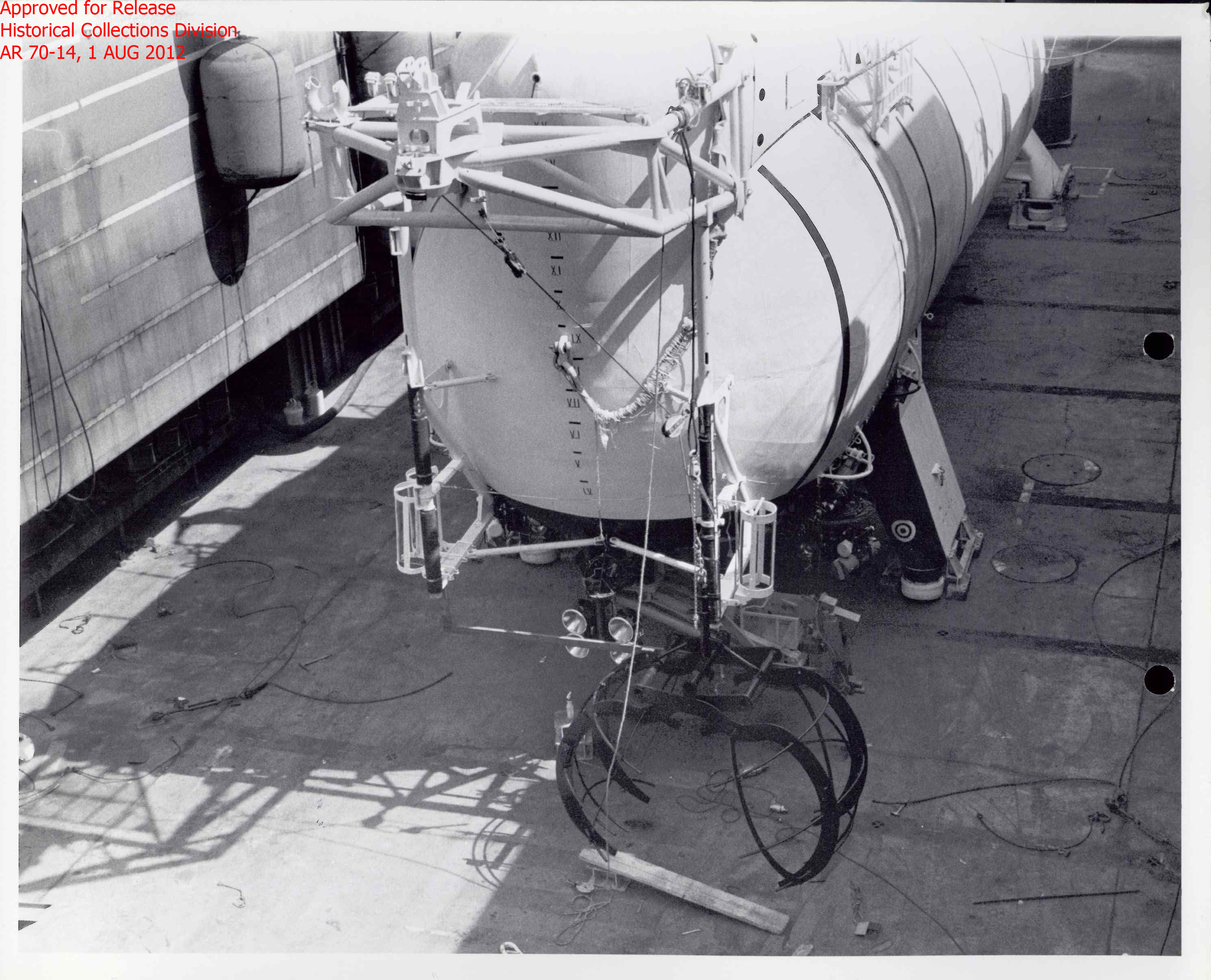
Perkin-Elmer designed recovery hook intended to salvage a sunken film capsule, 1972

Perkin-Elmer retained a strong presence in the military field through the 1960s and at the same time was significantly involved with OAO-3 a 36-inch Ultra Violet Space Telescope and Skylab. They contributed to the Apollo program by development of a CO_{2} sensor that was, however, supplanted by a Coleman Instruments product. PE at the Norwalk plant also conducted one of the first researches into computer-digital enhancement of scanned images, contracted for application to the Corona spy satellite, film imagery. They were a primary supplier of the optical systems used in many reconnaissance platforms, first in aircraft and high-altitude balloons, and then in reconnaissance satellites. A significant advance was 1955's Transverse Panoramic Camera, which took images on 12 by 14 ft (3.7 by 4.3 m) wide frames that provided single-frame images from horizon to horizon from an aircraft flying at 40,000 ft altitude. Such systems remained a major part of the company's income, capped by the installation of laser retroreflectors on the Moon as part of the Apollo 11 mission.

Elmer died at age 83 in 1954, and the company began trading shares over the counter. The company was listed on the New York Stock Exchange on 13 December 1960. Perkin remained as president and CEO until June 1961, when Robert Lewis, previously of Argus Camera and Sylvania Electric Products, took over these roles. Perkin remained the chairman of the board until his death in 1969.

=== Semiconductor manufacturing ===
In 1967, the U.S. Air Force asked Perkin-Elmer to produce an all-optical "masking" system for semiconductor fabrication. Previous systems used a pattern, the "mask", which was pressed onto the surface of the silicon wafer as part of the photolithography process. Small bits of dirt or photoresist would stick the mask and ruin the patterning for subsequent chips, and it was not uncommon for the vast majority of the chips from a given wafer to malfunction. The Air Force, which by the late 1960s was highly reliant on integrated circuits, desired a more reliable system.

Perkin-Elmer responded with the Microprojector, which was essentially a large photocopier system. The mask was placed in a holder and never touched the surface of the chip. Instead, the image was projected onto the surface. Making this work required a complex 16-element lens system that focussed a narrow range of wavelengths of light onto the mask. The remainder of the light from the 1,000 watt mercury-vapor lamp was filtered out. PE also developed a micro-densitometer in 1967 that scanned micro-chips for quality control

Harold Hemstreet was convinced that the concept could be simplified, and Abe Offner began the development of a system using mirrors instead of lenses, which did not suffer from the multispectral focussing problems of lenses. The result of this research was the Projection Scanning Aligner, or Micralign, which made chip making an assembly-line task and improved the number of working chips from perhaps 10% to 70% overnight. Chip prices plummeted as a result, with examples like the MOS 6502 selling for about US$20 while the previous generation of designs like the Motorola 6800 sold for around US$250.

The Micralign was so successful that Perkin-Elmer became the largest single vendor in the chip space in three years. In spite of this success, the company was largely a has-been by the 1980s due to their late response to the introduction of the stepping aligner, which allowed a single small mask to be stepped across the wafer, rather than requiring a single large mask covering the entire wafer. The company never regained their lead, and sold the division to The Silicon Valley Group.

=== Lab equipment ===
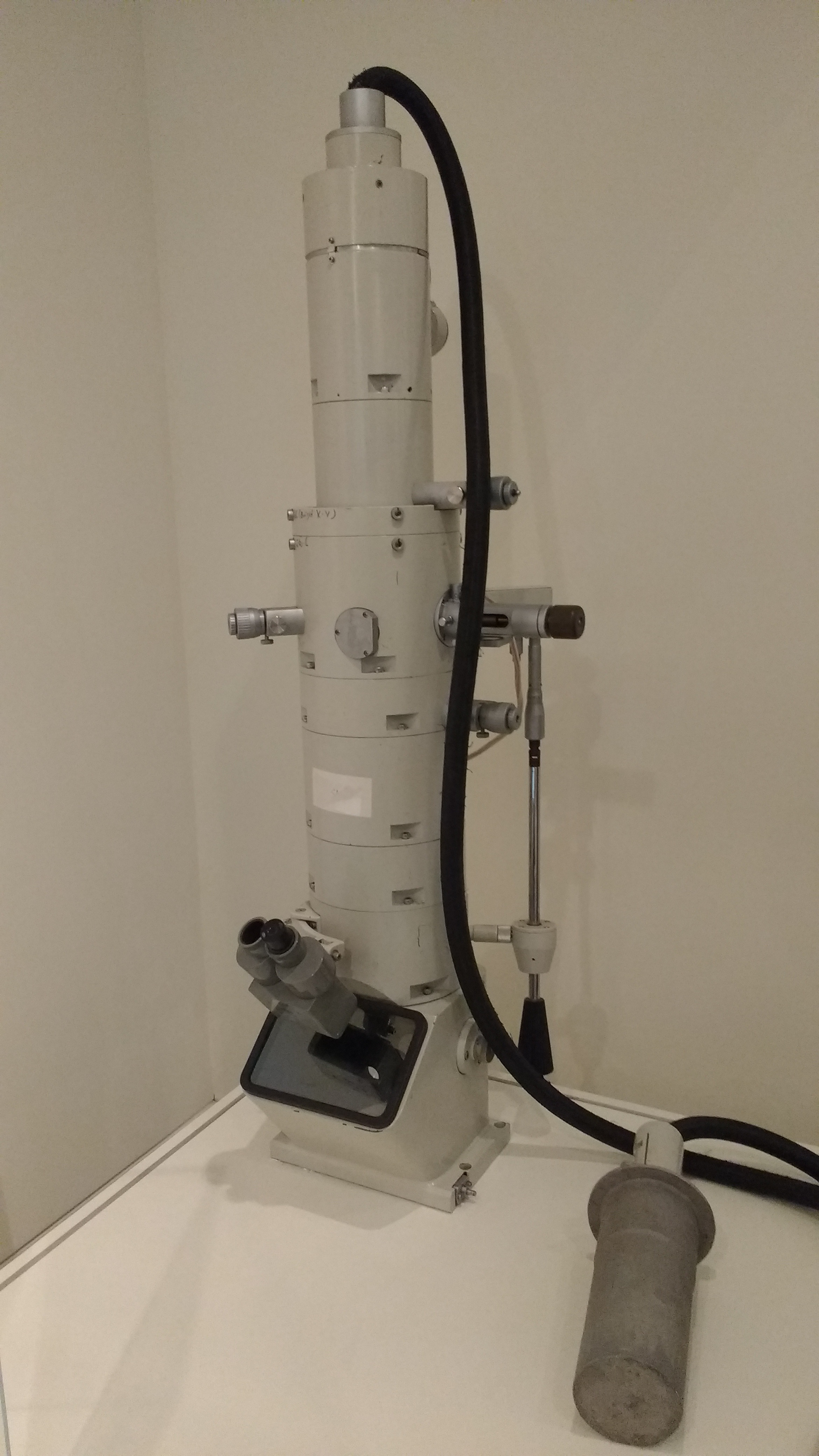
Perkin Elmer Transmission Electron Microscope, c. 1973

Perkin Elmer was a leading developer and supplier of lab analytic equipment from the 1950's. By the 1960's the Norwalk/Wilton, CT facilities were developing and producing a wide variety of instruments including multi-spectral spectrometers (IR, visible, UV), gas chromatographs, and atomic absorption spectrometers and Raman spectrometers. The plants housed integrated research, engineering, production (optical and electronic) and support facilities. In the early 1990s, partnered with Cetus Corporation (and later Hoffmann-La Roche) to pioneer the polymerase chain reaction (PCR) equipment industry. Analytical-instruments business was also operated from 1954 to 2001 in Germany, by the Bodenseewerk Perkin-Elmer GmbH located in Überlingen at Lake Constance, and England (Perkin Elmer Ltd) at Beaconsfield in Buckinghamshire.

=== Computer Systems Division ===
Perkin-Elmer was involved in computer manufacture for a time. The Perkin-Elmer Computer Systems Division was formed through the purchase of Interdata, Inc., an independent computer manufacturer, in 1973–1974 for some US$63 million. This merger made Perkin-Elmer's annual sales rise to over US$200 million. This was also known as Perkin-Elmer's Data Systems Group. The 32-bit computers were very similar to an IBM System/370, but ran the OS/32MT operating system. In 1976, Perkin-Elmer acquired Wangco, a Los Angeles manufacturer of tape drives for $30 million in a stock swap.

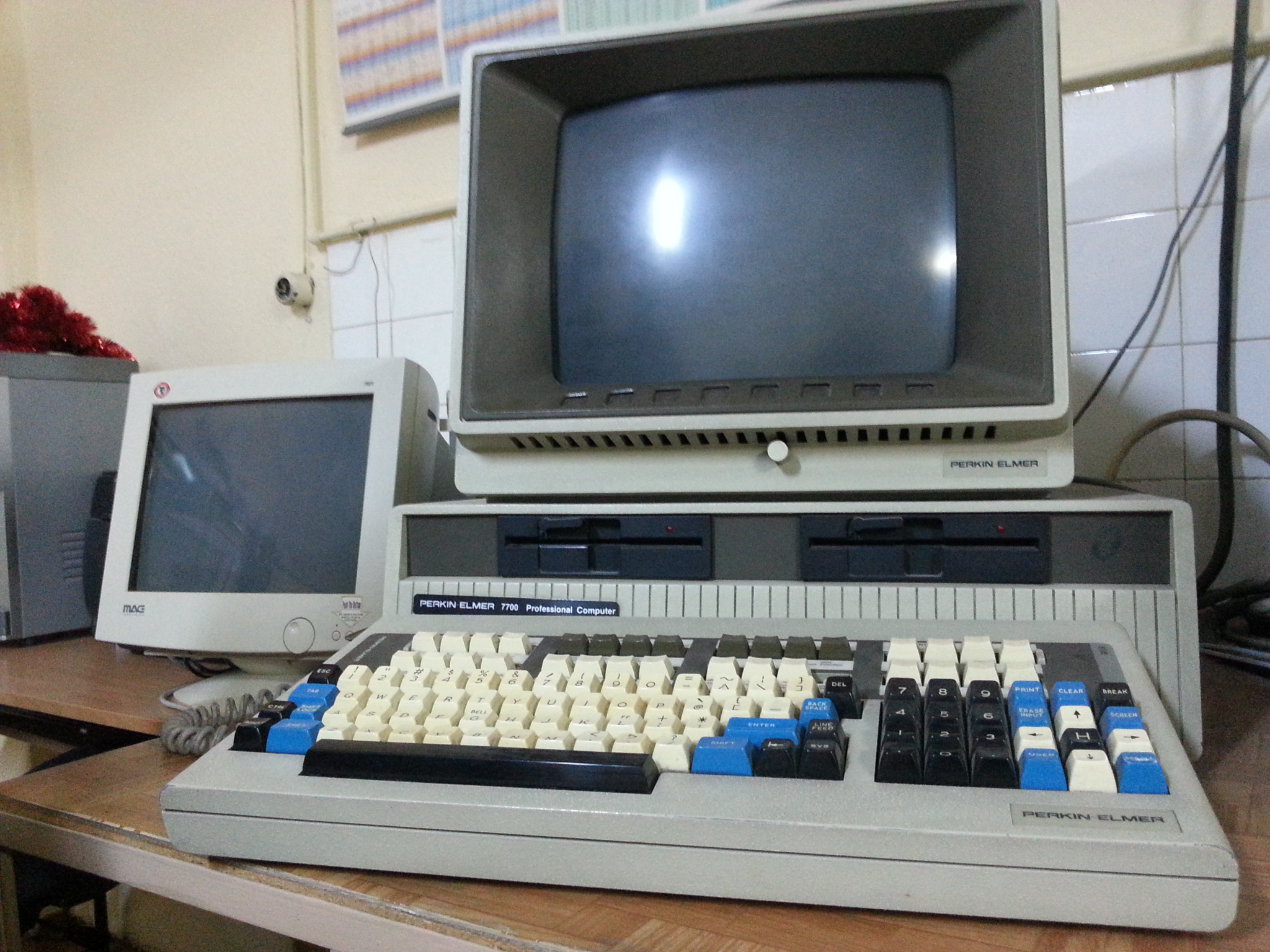
Perkin Elmer 7700 Professional Computer, c. 1983

The Computer Systems Division had a large presence in Monmouth County, New Jersey, with some 1,700 staff making it one of the county's largest private employers. Its plant in Oceanport had 800 employees alone. By the early-mid-1980s the computing group had sales of $259 million; while profitable, it tended to have reduced visibility within the computing industry due to being owned by a diversified parent.

The Wollongong Group provided the commercial version of the Unix port to the Interdata 7/32 hardware, known as Edition 7 Unix. The port was originally done by the University of Wollongong in New South Wales, Australia, and was the first UNIX port to hardware other than the Digital Equipment Corporation PDP family. By 1982, the Wollongong Group Edition 7 Unix and Programmer's Workbench (PWB) were available on models such as the Perkin-Elmer 3210 and 3240 minicomputers.

In 1985, the computing division of Perkin-Elmer was spun off as Concurrent Computer Corporation, with the goal of giving it and the parallel processing product a clearer identification within the computer industry. At first, the new company was a wholly owned subsidiary of Perkin-Elmer, but with the intentions of putting a minority ownership in the company up for a public stock sale. This was done one in February 1986, with Perkin-Elmer retaining an 82 percent stake in Concurrent. In 1988, there was a merger between Concurrent Computer Corporation and MASSCOMP; as part of the deal, Perkin-Elmer's share in Concurrent was bought out. At that point, Perkin-Elmer said they had culminated their multi-year process of exiting from computer market, allowing them to focus on their primary business segments.

=== 1999 ===
Modern PerkinElmer traces its history back to a merger between divisions of what had been two S&P 500 companies, EG&G Inc. (formerly NYSE: EGG) of Wellesley, Massachusetts and Perkin-Elmer (formerly NYSE: PKN) of Norwalk, Connecticut. On May 28, 1999, the non-government side of EG&G Inc. purchased the Analytical Instruments Division of Perkin-Elmer, its traditional business segment, for US$425 million, also assuming the Perkin-Elmer name and forming the new PerkinElmer company, with new officers and a new board of directors. At the time, EG&G made products for diverse industries including automotive, medical, aerospace and photography.

The old Perkin-Elmer Board of Directors and Officers remained at that reorganized company under its new name, PE Corporation. It had been the Life Sciences division of Perkin-Elmer, and its two component tracking stock business groups, Celera Genomics (NYSE: CRA) and PE Biosystems (formerly NYSE: PEB), were centrally involved in the highest profile biotechnology events of the decade, the intense race against the Human Genome Project consortium, which then resulted in the genomics segment of the technology bubble. Perkin-Elmer purchased the Boston operations of NEN Life Sciences in 2001.

=== Recently ===
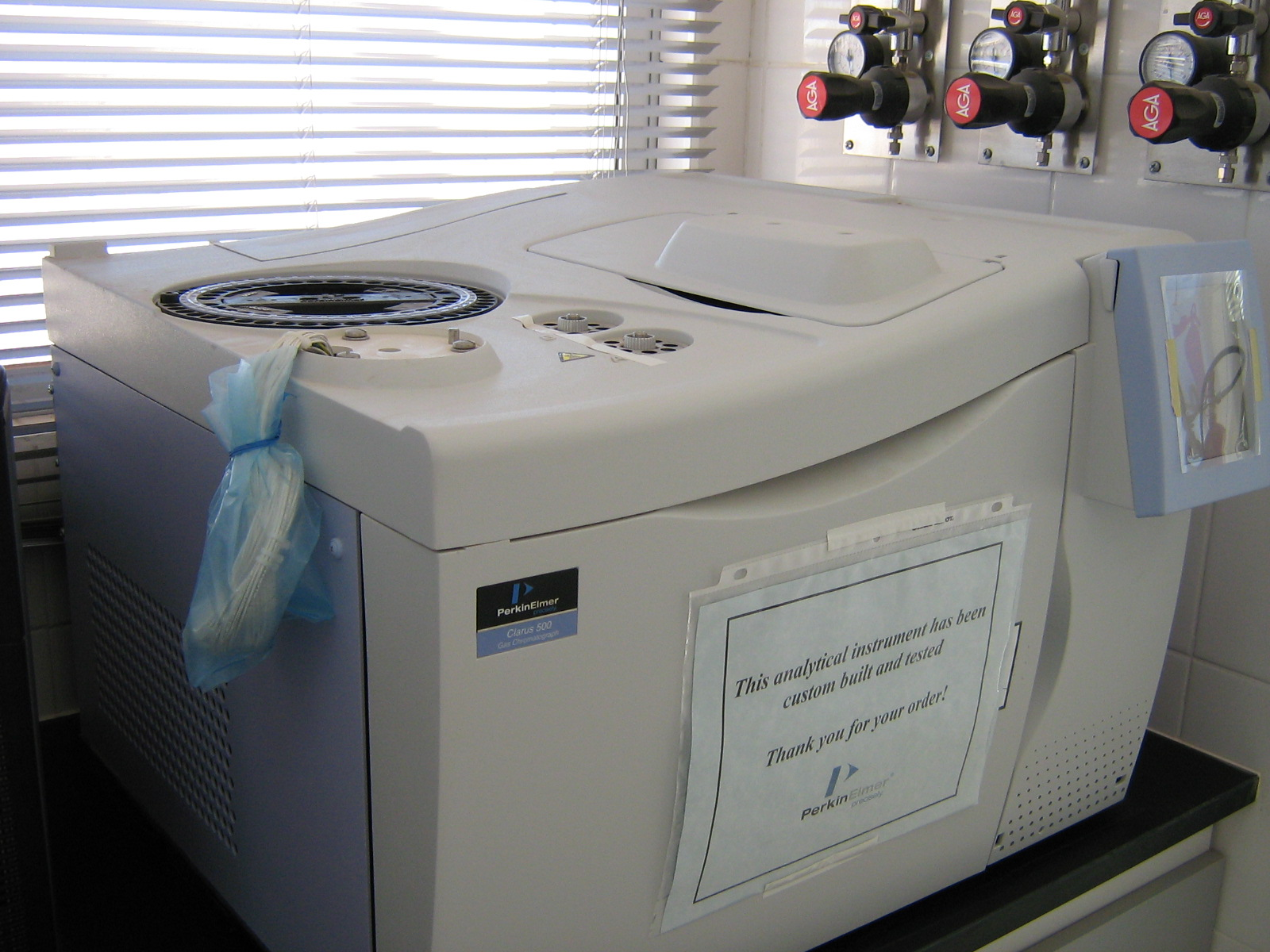
PerkinElmer gas chromatograph, 2008

In 1992, the company merged with Applied Biosystems. In 1997 they merged with PerSeptive Biosystems. On July 14, 1999, the new analytical instruments maker PerkinElmer cut 350 jobs, or 12%, in its cost reduction reorganization. In 2006, PerkinElmer sold off the Fluid Sciences division for approximately US$400 million; the aim of the selloff was to increase the strategic focus on its higher-growth health sciences and photonic markets. Following on from the selloff, a number of small businesses were acquired, including Spectral Genomics, Improvision, Evotec-Technologies, Euroscreen, ViaCell, and Avalon Instruments. The brand "Evotec-Technologies" remains the property of Evotec, the former owner company. PerkinElmer had a license to use the brand until the end of year 2007.

PerkinElmer has continued to expand its interest in medicine with the acquisitions of clinical laboratories, In July 2006, it acquired NTD Labs located on Long Island, New York. The laboratory specializes in prenatal screening during the first trimester of pregnancy. In 2007, it purchased ViaCell, Inc. for US$300 million, which included its offices in Boston and cord blood storage facility in Kentucky near Cincinnati. The company was renamed ViaCord. In 2001 Perkin Elmer acquired Packard Bioscience Inc from its majority shareholder, Dick McKernen. This acquisition also came with Agincourt Technologies Inc and consolidated Perkin Elmer's position in laboratory robotics, in particular, liquid handling robots which were to prove essential for the high-throughput sequencing needed for the Human Genome Project.

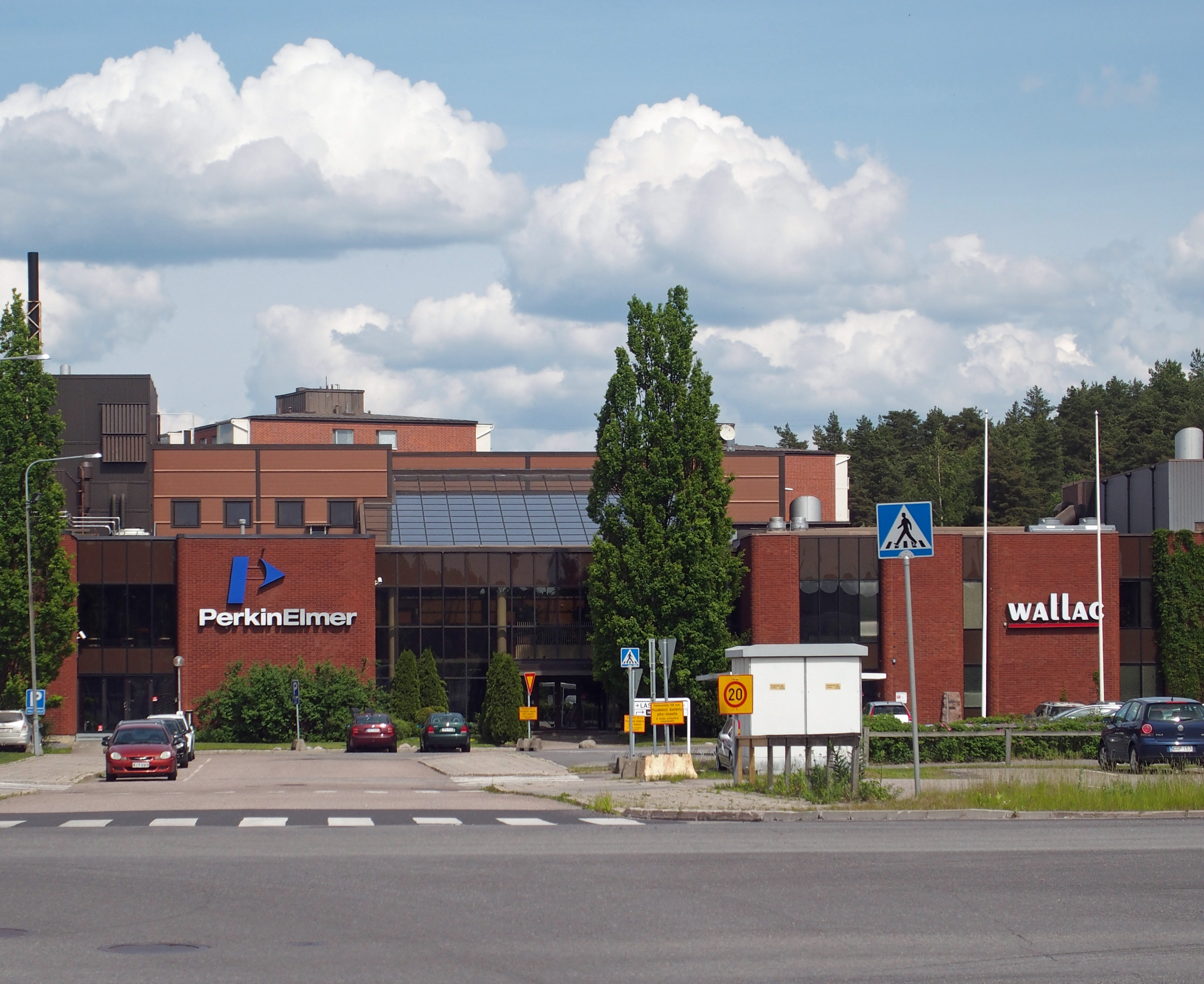
PerkinElmer facility in Finland, 2017

In March 2008, PerkinElmer purchased Pediatrix Screening (formerly Neo Gen Screening), a laboratory located in Bridgeville, Pennsylvania specializing in screening newborns for various inborn errors of metabolism such as phenylketonuria, hypothyroidism, and sickle-cell disease. It renamed the laboratory PerkinElmer Genetics, Inc.

In May 2011, PerkinElmer announced the signature of an agreement to acquire CambridgeSoft, and the successful acquisition of ArtusLabs.

In September 2011, PerkinElmer bought Caliper Life Sciences for US$600 million.

In December 2014 PerkinElmer acquired Perten Instruments for US$266 million to expand in food testing.

In January 2016, PerkinElmer acquired Swedish firm Vanadis Diagnostics.

In February 2016 PerkinElmer acquired Delta Instruments.

In January 2017, the company announced it would acquire the Indian in vitro diagnostic company, Tulip Diagnostics. In May 2017, the company acquired Euroimmun Medical Laboratory Diagnostics for approximately US$1.3 billion.

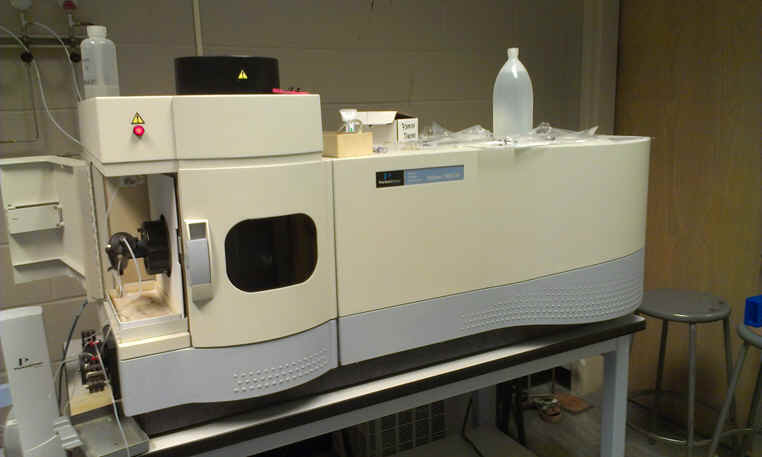
PerkinElmer optical emission spectrometer, 2014

In 2018, the company acquired Australian biotech company, RHS Ltd., Chinese manufacturer of analytical instruments, Shanghai Spectrum Instruments Co. Ltd., and France-based company Cisbio Bioassays, which specializes in diagnostics and drug discovery solutions.

In November 2020, PerkinElmer announced it would acquire Horizon Discovery Group for around US$383 million.

In March 2021, PerkinElmer announced that the company has completed its acquisition of Oxford Immunotec Global PLC (Oxford Immunotec). In May of the same year, the business announced it would purchase Nexcelom Bioscience for $260 million and Immunodiagnostic Systems Holdings PLC for $155 million. In June the company announced it would acquire SIRION Biotech, a specialist in viral vector gene delivery methods. In July the business announced it would acquire BioLegend for $5.25 billion.

=== Acquisition history ===
PerkinElmer acquisitions
- PerkinElmer (Est. 1935, modern company formed from EG&G Inc. purchase of Perkin-Elmer, Analytical Instruments Division)
  - Applied Biosystems (Merged 1992)
  - PerSeptive Biosystems. (Acq. 1997)
  - Spectral Genomics
  - Improvision
  - Evotec-Technologies
  - Euroscreen
  - ViaCell
  - Avalon Instruments
  - Packard Bioscience Inc (Acq. 2003)
  - NTD Labs (Acq. 2006)
  - ViaCell, Inc. (Acq. 2007)
  - Pediatrix Screening (Acq. 2008)
  - CambridgeSoft (Acq. 2011)
  - ArtusLabs (Acq. 2011)
  - Caliper Life Sciences (Acq. 2011)
    - Zymark (Acq. 2003)
    - NovaScreen Biosciences Corporation (Acq. 2005)
    - Xenogen Corporation (Acq. 2006)
      - Xenogen Biosciences
    - Cambridge Research & Instrumentation Inc. (Acq. 2010)
    - Xenogen Corporation (Acq. 2006)
    - Xenogen Corporation (Acq. 2006)
  - Perten Instruments (Acq. 2014)
  - Vanadis Diagnostics (Acq. 2016)
  - Delta Instruments (Acq. 2016)
  - Tulip Diagnostics (Acq. 2017)
  - Euroimmun Medical Laboratory Diagnostics (Acq. 2017)
  - RHS Ltd (Acq. 2018)
  - Shanghai Spectrum Instruments Co. Ltd (Acq. 2018)
  - Cisbio Bioassays (Acq. 2018)
  - Horizon Discovery Group (Acq. 2020)
  - Oxford Immunotec Global PLC (Acq. 2021)
  - Nexcelom Bioscience (Acq. 2021)
  - Immunodiagnostic Systems Holdings PLC (Acq. 2021)
  - SIRION Biotech (Acq. 2021)
  - BioLegend (Acq. 2021)
    - BioLegend Japan KK
    - BioLegend UK Ltd
    - BioLegend GmbH

== Programs ==
=== Hubble optics project ===
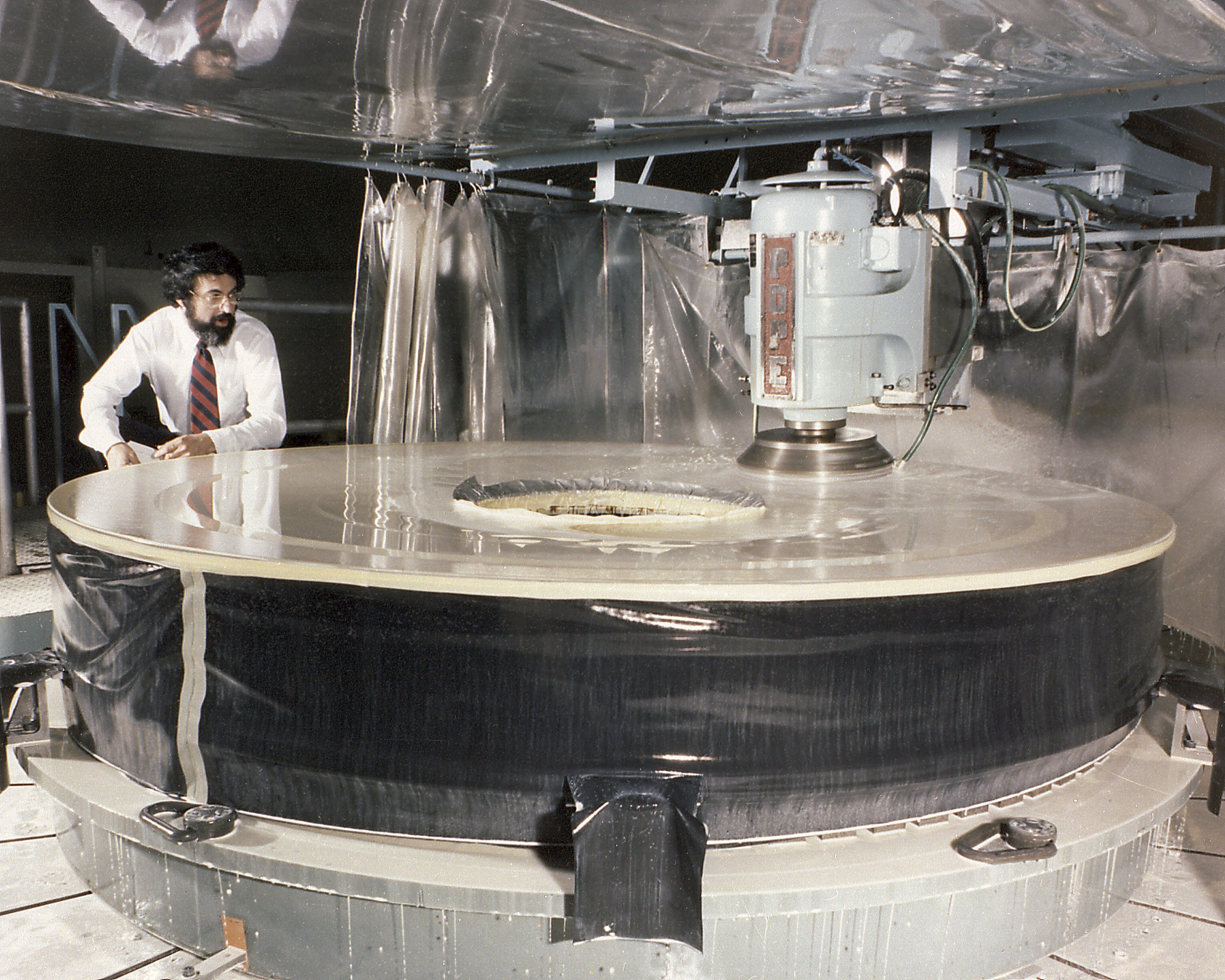
Polishing of Hubble's primary mirror begins at Perkin-Elmer corporation, Danbury, Connecticut, May 1979. The engineer pictured is Dr. Martin Yellin, an optical engineer working for Perkin-Elmer on the project.

Perkin-Elmer's Danbury Optical System unit was commissioned to build the optical components of the Hubble Space Telescope. The construction of the main mirror began in 1979 and completed in 1981. The polishing process ran over budget and behind schedule, producing significant friction with NASA. Due to a miscalibrated null corrector, the primary mirror was also found to have a significant spherical aberration after reaching orbit on STS-31. Perkin-Elmer's own calculations and measurements revealed the primary mirror's surface discrepancies, but the company chose to withhold that data from NASA. A NASA investigation heavily criticized Perkin-Elmer for management failings, disregarding written quality guidelines, and ignoring test data that revealed the miscalibration. Corrective optics were installed on the telescope during the first Hubble service and repair mission STS-61. The correction, Corrective Optics Space Telescope Axial Replacement, was applied entirely to the secondary mirror and replaced existing instrumentation; the aberration of the primary mirror remained uncorrected.

The company agreed to pay US$15 million, essentially forgoing its fees in polishing the mirror, to avoid a threatened liability lawsuit under the False Claims Act by the Federal government. Hughes Aircraft, which acquired the Danbury Optical System unit one month after the launch of the telescope, paid US$10 million. The Justice Department asserted that the companies should have known about the flawed testing. Trade group Aerospace Industries Association protested when concerns were raised in the aerospace industry that aerospace companies might be held liable for failed equipment.

=== KH-9 Hexagon ===
Perkin-Elmer built the optical systems for the KH-9 Hexagon series of spy satellites at a facility in Danbury, Connecticut.
