= European Reference Genome Atlas =

Genome project cataloging Europe's eukaryotic species

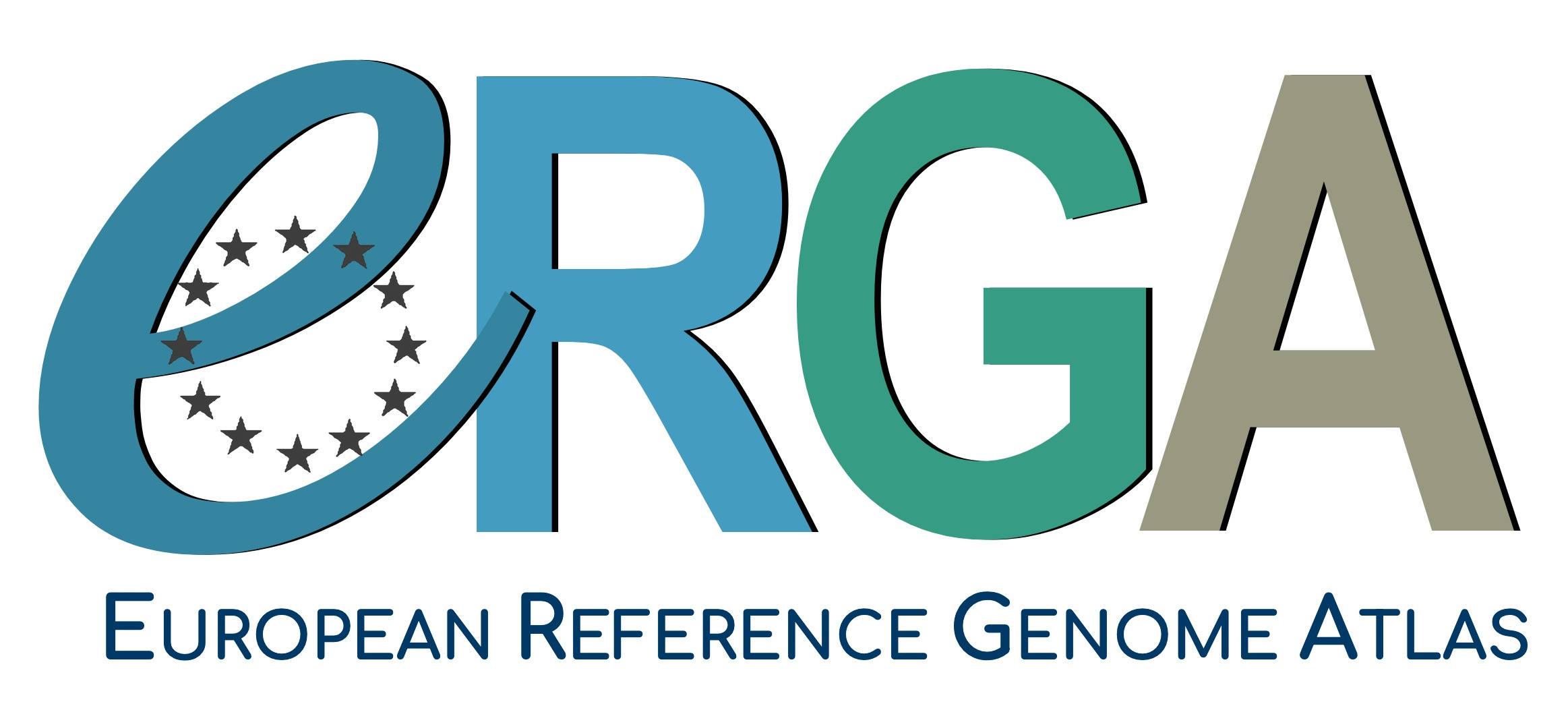

The European Reference Genome Atlas (ERGA) is a community initiative coordinating the production of a reference genome for all eukaryotic species in Europe. This involves field sampling and DNA sequencing, followed by sequence assembly and annotation, to generate a catalogue of genomes that meet reference quality standards. As the European regional node of the Earth BioGenome Project (EBP), ERGA collaborates with other genome projects worldwide, such as the African BioGenome Project and the Vertebrate Genomes Project

== Background ==
ERGA was launched in 2020 to build a European initiative with a focus on reference genome production. Community formalisation included establishing the Council of representatives from all participating countries and setting up the Committees to oversee the main stages of the genome generation workflow. Community establishment continued through activities of the Council and Committees, setting up of Core Projects, partnering with technology providers such as Pacific BioSciences and Arima Genomics, publication of a forum article and a community review article, as well as defining the goals, principles, and participation of the ERGA community. Core Projects include the Pilot Project, aiming to complete at least one reference genome from each ERGA-associated country, and the Horizon Europe funded Biodiversity Genomics Europe Project, a joint endeavour with the International Barcode of Life Europe community, as well as building the ERGA Knowledge Hub that gathers and shares educational materials on biodiversity genomics and related topics to promote knowledge exchange.
