= ISCB Africa ASBCB Conference on Bioinformatics =

African academic conference

- Discipline: Bioinformatics; Computational Biology

Publication details
- Publisher: International Society for Computational Biology; African Society for Bioinformatics and Computational Biology
- History: 2007-present
- Website: www.iscb.org/africa2025/home

The ISCB Africa ASBCB Conference on Bioinformatics is a biennial academic conference on the subjects of bioinformatics and computational biology, organized by the African Society for Bioinformatics and Computational Biology (ASBCB) in conjunction with the International Society for Computational Biology (ISCB), of which the ASBCB is an African affiliate.

== Origin ==
The conference was first held in 2007 as the "ASBCB Conference on the Bioinformatics of African Pathogens, Hosts and Vectors".

== List of conferences ==
Year	Location	Venue	Notes
2007	Nairobi, Kenya	International Livestock Research Institute	
2009	Bamako, Mali	Azalai Hotel Salam	First conference with ISCB
2011	Cape Town, South Africa	Cape Town International Convention Centre	
2013	Casablanca, Morocco	Novotel Casablanca City Center Hotel	
2015	Dar es Salaam, Tanzania	White Sands Resort & Conference Centre	
2017	Entebbe, Uganda	Uganda Virus Research Institute	
2019	Kumasi, Ghana	Kwame Nkrumah University of Science and Technology	
2021	Virtual Event	Not applicable	Due to impact of COVID-19 pandemic
2025	Cape Town, South Africa	Lagoon Beach Hotel, Conference Centre & Spa	

== Current identity ==
Since 2009, the conference has been jointly organized with the International Society for Computational Biology (ISCB) and held in different locations within Africa. Although having an evident African focus, the meeting is intended to be a truly international event, encompassing scientists and students from leading institutions in the US, Latin America, Europe and Africa. Holding this event in Africa, ISCB and ASBCB intend to promote local efforts for cooperation and dissemination of leading research techniques to combat major African diseases.

== Conference goals ==
In combination with the ISCB, with its global perspective, one goal of the ISCB Africa ASBCB Conference is to expose and educate both junior and established scientists to the latest bioinformatics tools and techniques so that they can be used in researching treatments and cures, in the African context of the ASBCB, focusing on hosts, vectors and disease.

As a conference that involves participants from countries across Africa and elsewhere, a second, but definitely not lesser, goal of the ISCB Africa ASBCB Conference is to improve existing capacity for public health interventions in African countries by supporting collaboration and establishing networks for development and training. This builds upon the activities of the ASBCB outside of the conference, for example in supporting the H3ABioNet project and its successor actions.

== Format of the meeting ==
The meeting usually consists of a 3-day conference followed by practical workshops.

=== Keynote speakers ===
Senior speakers with affiliations or backgrounds in different African countries give keynote talks. At the 2025 ISCB Africa ASBCB Conference on Bioinformatics the keynote speakers were Alan Christoffels, Alia Ben Khala, Anne von Gottburg and Aida Ouangraoua.

=== Main conference ===
In addition to keynote talks, a lot of time at the conference is available for other speakers across the broad range of topics covered. These range from introductions to computational techniques such as machine learning applicable to bioinformatics, to reports on progress on genomics and other omics analysis. Other talks focus on the public health problems that many African countries face with the control of tropical diseases. Virtual presentations can also be included from international bioinformatics organisations such as EMBL-EBI.

=== External impact ===
ISCB Africa ASBCB Conferences on Bioinformatics are useful not just in attracting media attention for the conferences themselves but for increasing understanding of the implications of bioinformatics in the wider world.

=== Student engagement ===
The ISCB has a Student Council that organises symposia, workshops and networking sessions within conferences organised by the ISCB. A Student Symposium is organised at each ISCB Africa ASBCB Conference through the Regional Student Group structure of the ISCB Student Council. This is an opportunity for students and other early-career researchers to present reports on their ongoing projects and to hear advice from other conference attendees.

=== Workshops and tutorials ===
Because bioinformatics depends so much on skills in using tools to analyse biological data (see bioinformatics databases and bioinformatics software tools for examples) the workshops and tutorials that are held in conjunction with each ISCB Africa ASBCB Conference on Bioinformatics may be the most important outcome of each one.

Immediately prior to the 2011 conference in Cape Town, participants gathered at the University of the Western Cape for a workshop on the bioinformatics tool eBioKit. Immediately following the 2021 meeting the ASBCB collaborated with the National Institutes of Health Office of Data Science Strategy in delivering an online Omics Codeathon.

Tutorials held at the 2025 ISCB Africa ASBCB Conference on Bioinformatics introduced the Afrigen-D (African Genomics Data Hub), as well as the cobrapy package for constraint-based modelling of metabolic networks at a genomic scale.

=== Poster sessions ===
In parallel with the rest of the programme there are poster sessions, allowing researchers to present their on-going activities in a concise form and to discuss it with other conference attendees.

=== Scientific publications ===
Since 2009, the ISCB Africa ASBCB Conference has been partnering with the Infection, Genetics and Evolution journal to publish papers presented at the conference. More recently the Bioinformatics Gateway of the F1000 online publishing platform in collaboration with the ISCB has provided an additional means of publishing material from the conference.
