= SANBI =

SANBI may refer to different South African institutions:

- South African National Biodiversity Institute - carrying out research and management of South Africa's biodiversity resources
- South African National Bioinformatics Institute - carrying out research in bioinformatics, biotechnology and medical genomics
