= Alan Christoffels =

South African academic

- Born: Kensington, Cape Town, South Africa
- Occupations: Bioinformatics scientist, academic, and an author

Academic background
- Education: BSc. (1992), BSc. (1993), MSc. (1995), Ph.D. (2001)
- Alma mater: University of Cape Town; Stellenbosch University; University of the Western Cape
- Thesis: Generation of a human gene index and its application to disease candidacy (2001)

Academic work
- Institutions: South African National Bioinformatics Institute, University of the Western Cape

Alan Christoffels is a bioinformatics scientist, academic, and an author. He is Professor of Bioinformatics, and the director of the South African National Bioinformatics Institute at the University of the Western Cape. He has been serving as a senior advisor to the Africa Centres for Disease Control and Prevention Pathogen genomics & Partnerships and DSI/NRF Research Chair in Bioinformatics and Public Health Genomics.

Christoffels' primary contributions and research work are in the areas of host-pathogen interaction, genome evolution, pathogen genomics, and biobank LIMS.

Christoffels is a founding member of Global Emerging Pathogens Consortium, elected member of the Academy of Science of South Africa, and President of the African Society for Bioinformatics and Computational Biology from 2020 until 2022. He was elected as a fellow of the Royal Society of South Africa in 2022.

== Education ==
Christoffels graduated with BSc. in Microbiology and Biochemistry in 1992 and BSc (Hons.) in Pharmacology from the University of Cape Town in 1993. Between 1995 and 1997, he enrolled at the Stellenbosch University for a MSc. in Genetics. His research centered upon identification of novel markers in the fine mapping of a locally prevalent cardiac disease (PFHB1). He proceeded with a Ph.D. in bioinformatics at the South African National Bioinformatics Institute University of the Western Cape. His thesis was titled, "Generation of a human gene index and its application to disease candidacy".

== Career ==
Christoffels started his academic career in 1994 as a Genetics Technician in medical Biochemistry at the Stellenbosch University. Between 2001 and 2004, he held the postdoctoral fellowship at the Institute of Molecular & Cell Biology in Singapore. Followed by this appointment, he served as an Adjunct Assistant Professor at the Nanyang Technological University based in Singapore. Later on, he held the appointment of associate professor from 2007 to 2012 in the South African National Bioinformatics Institute at the University of the Western Cape. He was promoted to the position of Professor in 2013 and currently holds this appointment.

From 2009, Christoffels serves as the Director of South African National Bioinformatics Institute at the University of the Western Cape. For the next five years, he served on the board of directors for International Society for Computational Biology (ISCB). He has been holding the appointment of SA Medical Research Council Unit Director at the Bioinformatics Capacity Development Unit since 2012. Later on, he held a brief appointment as vice president for the South African Society for Bioinformatics. He was appointed as President of African Society of Bioinformatics & Computational Biology in 2020 for a two-year term.

Followed by stakeholder meeting convened by Bill & Melinda Gates Foundation, Christoffels and his international partners launched a global initiative called Public Health Alliance for Genomic Epidemiology in October 2019 at the GrandChallenges meeting in Ethiopia. He serves as the principal investigator of this initiative. The research prototypes generated in the lab are integrated into the working groups within the alliance.

== Research ==
Christoffels has more than 400 publications under his name. His research spans host-pathogen interaction, pathogen genomics, genome evolution with a particular focus on the genome annotation and sequence data analysis.

=== Public health bioinformatics ===
Christoffels and a team of scientists at his lab based in South African National Bioinformatics Institute presented the first genome sequence of SARS-CoV-2, the virus that causes COVID-19, found in South Africa. His recent work features conducting research on scaling up disease surveillance systems on the African continent.

Christoffels has developed technologies for application of bioinformatics in public health. He has developed an analysis platform for Tuberculosis sequencing data called COMBAT-TB. This tool can be deployed in resource limited settings.

=== Biobank LIMS ===
With a group of researchers, Christoffels developed a management system for biobanking, Laboratory Information Management System (LIMS) at the South African National Bioinformatics Institute. The purpose of the management system is to collect, store, process and, manage the bio samples appropriately. This human biobanking system is based upon the Plone web-content management framework.

=== Disease vectors ===
Christoffels has focused his genomics research on the disease vectors. In 2016, he described the non-coding RNA (miRNA) in Anopheles funestus, and postulated roles of these small genes in understanding of parasitic control by blood-sucking mosquito. He co-led a tsetse fly genome project between 2008 and 2014 where he and his students studied the way a fly regulates its own immune system and protects itself against iron toxicity. He has subsequently used his analytical methods to describe non-coding RNA regulation in the Black soldier fly.

=== Genome sequencing and annotation projects (2004-2016) ===
Christoffels' earlier research focused on sequencing, annotating, and analyzing genomes. He analyzed the genome assembly and annotation of the Fugu rubripes. With an over 95% sequenced coverage, it is indicated that the 80% of the assembly is in multigene-sized scaffolds. The study reported that in the genome, the repetitive DNA occupy less than one-sixth of the sequence, whereas the gene loci occupy about one-third of the genome. It also highlighted that protein evolution since 450 million years, although the three-quarters of human proteins had either diverged from or did not have pufferfish homologs. Given a significant gene order scrambling, the conserved linkages between Fugu rubripes and humans show the preservation of segments of chromosomes associated with the common vertebrate ancestor. A systematic comparison was carried out between the draft genome sequence of Fugu and humans for identifying paralogous chromosomal regions in the Fugu. The duplicate genes were indicated in the Fugu after using phylogenetic analyses of the Fugu, human and invertebrate sequences. The analysis determined evidence for 425 fish-specific duplicate genes in the Fugu and indicated that at least 6.6% of the genome is represented by fish-specific paralogons. The study also strongly suggests a whole-genome duplication during the ray-finned fish evolution, which may also have occurred before the origin of teleosts.

In 2013, Christoffels reported the analysis of the African coelacanth genome. The genome sequence provided genetic changes which address the adaption from the aquatic environment to land. The study was conducted for obtaining insights into the tetrapod evolution. The phylogenomic analysis highlighted the closest living association of lungfish with the tetrapod instead of coelacanth. The protein-coding genes of Coelacanth also revealed a slow evolution than that of tetrapod.

In 2013, Christoffels completed the annotation of the coelacanth genome in his lab. Later on, the analysis on the taste and odorant receptors in the coelacanth was carried out and it was demonstrated that the repertoire of GPCR chemosensory receptors (CRs) of the Coelacanth supports its intermediary position.

The Tsetse project spanned nearly 10 years. Christoffels was part of the executive team who managed the genome project, and led the scientific analyses by supervising the Ph.D. students who analyzed different regions of the genome in detail as it pertains to innate protection against the pathogen (Trypanosome), Trypanosomatid SNAREs comparison, chemical signaling to find a host, and promoter architecture in Tsetse.

Followed by his sequencing projects in coelacanth and Tsetse genomes, Christoffels co-lead the genome assembly and annotation of the Asian Seabass in 2014. The group combined for the first-time long reads (PacBio) and short reads (illumina) sequencing data to assemble a non-model eukaryotic genome at that time. He also led the genome assembly and annotation teams in South Africa and Singapore. He had defined the parameters for non-model organisms as well.

=== Community engagement ===
He has authored three books, titled How to be a Health Activist: Teacher's Guide, How to Be a Health Activist: A Life Orientation Workbook, and How to Be a Health Activist: A life skills workbook for grades 7-9 learners.

Throughout his research career, Christoffels has added a community engagement dimension to his work. He has achieved this initially with integrating awareness of Tuberculosis into school curricula activities. Later he developed audio books for communicating the value of biobanks in multiple languages.

== Awards and honors ==
- 2014 – South African Medical Research Council Silver Award
- 2015 – Hamilton Naki Award, National Research Foundation
- 2016 – Fulbright Visiting Scholar Award
- 2017 – Outstanding Alumnus Award, University of the Western Cape

== Bibliography ==
=== Books ===
- How to be a Health Activist: Teacher's Guide (2013) ISBN 978-0-86808-745-0
- How to Be a Health Activist: A Life Orientation Workbook (2014) ISBN 978-0-86808-748-1
- How to Be a Health Activist: A life skills workbook for grades 7-9 learners (2014) ISBN 978-0-620-51650-1

=== Selected articles ===
- Aparicio, S., Chapman, J., Stupka, E., Putnam, N., Chia, J. M., Dehal, P., ... & Brenner, S. (2002). Whole-genome shotgun assembly and analysis of the genome of Fugu rubripes. Science, 297(5585), 1301–1310.
- Christoffels, A., Koh, E. G., Chia, J. M., Brenner, S., Aparicio, S., & Venkatesh, B. (2004). Fugu genome analysis provides evidence for a whole-genome duplication early during the evolution of ray-finned fishes. Molecular biology and evolution, 21(6), 1146–1151.
- Amemiya, C. T., Alföldi, J., Lee, A. P., Fan, S., Philippe, H., MacCallum, I., ... & Lindblad-Toh, K. (2013). The African coelacanth genome provides insights into tetrapod evolution. Nature, 496(7445), 311–316.
- Vij, S., Kuhl, H., Kuznetsova, I. S., Komissarov, A., Yurchenko, A. A., Van Heusden, P., ... & Orbán, L. (2016). Chromosomal-level assembly of the Asian seabass genome using long sequence reads and multi-layered scaffolding. PLoS genetics, 12(4), e1005954.
- Allam, M., Spillings, B. L., Abdalla, H., Mapiye, D., Koekemoer, L. L., & Christoffels, A. (2016). Identification and characterization of microRNAs expressed in the African malaria vector Anopheles funestus life stages using high throughput sequencing. Malaria Journal, 15(1), 1–15.
- Choudhury, A., Ramsay, M., Hazelhurst, S., Aron, S., Bardien, S., Botha, G., ... & Pepper, M. S. (2017). Whole-genome sequencing for an enhanced understanding of genetic variation among South Africans. Nature communications, 8(1), 1–12.
- Lose, T., van Heusden, P., & Christoffels, A. (2020). COMBAT-TB-NeoDB: fostering tuberculosis research through integrative analysis using graph database technologies. Bioinformatics, 36(3), 982–983.
- van Heusden, P., Mashologu, Z., Lose, T., Warren, R., & Christoffels, A. (2022). The COMBAT-TB Workbench: Making Powerful Mycobacterium tuberculosis Bioinformatics Accessible. Msphere, 7(1), e00991-21.
