= MIVEGEC =

French research institute specialized on virology, evolutionary biology

- Maladies infectieuses et vecteurs : écologie, génétique, évolution et contrôle
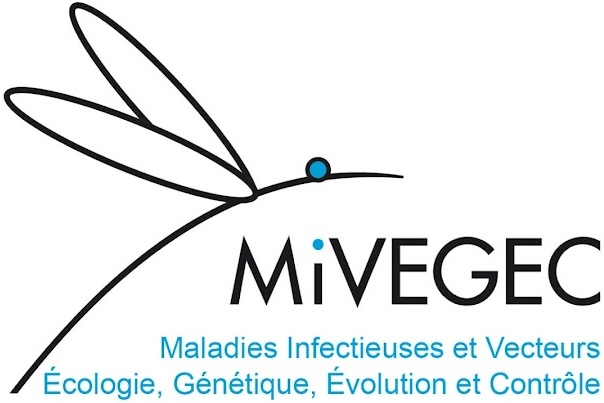
- Established: 2011
- Research type: Research Institute (Unité mixte de recherche, UMR)
- Director: Frédéric Simard (2015–present)
- Staff: approx. 160 (incl. 40 PhD students)
- Location: Montpellier, France; 43°38′44.7″N 3°52′1.2″E
- Affiliations: IRD; CNRS; INRAE; University of Montpellier
- Website: https://mivegec.fr/en

MIVEGEC (French acronym for Maladies infectieuses et vecteurs : écologie, génétique, évolution et contrôle, literally Infectious Diseases and Vectors: Ecology, Genetics, Evolution and Control) is a French research institute (UMR 5290 - unité mixte de recherche) established in 2011, overseen by the IRD (Research Institute for Development), the CNRS (National Centre for Scientific Research), and the University of Montpellier, with secondary oversight by INRAE.

== Overview ==
MIVEGEC brings together approximately 160 staff members, including about 40 PhD candidates, across three main sites in Montpellier, organized into five scientific departments encompassing 14 research teams.... The institute focuses on the ecology and evolution of infectious diseases, vector biology, host–pathogen interactions, and the development of strategies to control disease transmission. The institute is renowned for its expertise on viral and parasitic diseases (zika, dengue, chikungunya, ebola, leishmaniasis).

== Research themes ==
MIVEGEC conducts integrative multi-scale research, from molecular mechanisms to ecological and evolutionary dynamics of infectious agents and vectors. Its goals include understanding pathogen maintenance and transmission, and developing innovative tools and strategies to combat infectious and parasitic diseases in humans and animals, often under a One Health framework.

== Departments ==
The research is structured into five departments, each led by specific researchers:

- PEEC – Processus écologiques et évolutifs au sein des communautés (Ecological and evolutionary processes within communities). Heads: Karen McCoy and Olivier Duron.
- EPATH – Pathogènes, environnement, santé humaine (Pathogens, environment, human health). Heads: Anne-Laure Bañuls and Yvon Sterkers.
- ESV – Évolution des systèmes vectoriels (Evolution of vector systems). Heads: Isabelle Morlais and Christophe Paupy.
- PEV – Perturbations, évolution, virulence (Disturbances, evolution, virulence). Heads: Élodie Chapuis and Ignacio Bravo.
- EDIFICE – Biologie des infections virales : émergence, diffusion, impact, contrôle, élimination (Biology of viral infections: emergence, spread, impact, control, elimination). Heads: Dorothée Missé and Pierre Becquart.

== International presence ==
In addition to its main sites in Montpellier, MIVEGEC maintains offices, research platforms, and collaborations in numerous endemic regions including Bolivia, Brazil, Burkina Faso, Cambodia, Cameroon, Ivory Coast, Gabon, French Guiana, Réunion, Madagascar, Mexico, Polynesia, Senegal, Thailand, Vietnam, and Zimbabwe.

== Partnerships and facilities ==
MIVEGEC hosts and contributes to several specialized facilities:

- 'Vectopôle', a secured insectarium hosted by IRD Occitanie (Lavalette site)
- The National Reference Centre for Leishmaniasis (CHU Montpellier site).
- A bioinformatics platform (IRD Occitanie, Lavalette).

It also provides extensive research tools, such as an entomological collection of nearly 400,000 specimens, parasite identification software (“identiciels”), and morphometric tools.

The unit is associated with multiple research structures like CeMEB (Mediterranean Centre for Environment and Biodiversity), ParaFrap (French Alliance against Parasitic Diseases), CEBA (Center for the study of biodiversity in Amazonia), and manages or contributes to scientific networks including TIS Network, Crees, CREEC, and the French Bacteriophage Network. MIVEGEC is also a collaborating center of the WHO for evaluating public health pesticides

Further, the unit participates in numerous international programs such as CANECEV, ELDORADO, DRISA, GRAVIR, IMPALA, LAMIVECT, SENTINELA, and STIMULI.

== Communication and impact ==
MIVEGEC is active in scientific communication and leadership. Its members hold editorial positions in journals including Infection, Genetics and Evolution (editor-in-chief) and Journal of Evolutionary Medicine (associate editor since 2011), as well as editorial boards of various scientific journals. The unit has received multiple CNRS silver medals and has hosted key events like the European Society for Vector Ecology conference. MIVEGEC also contributes to national structures, including the INEE (Ecology and Environment Institute), ANR evaluations, and conducts annual scientific expert assessments.

According to the French evaluation agency HCÉRES, since 2011 MIVEGEC researchers have published over 2,700 articles in journals such as Parasites & Vectors, Scientific Reports, Malaria Journal, Infection, Genetics and Evolution, PLOS Neglected Tropical Diseases, PLOS One, Evolutionary Applications, Viruses, and Molecular Ecology. The unit also features in regional and national outreach publications, maintains its own YouTube channel and appears in academic blogs.

== Awards ==
- 2020: Virginie Rougeron, CNRS Bronze Medal
- 2019: Patrick Durand, CNRS Crystal Medal
- 2012: Frédéric Thomas, CNRS Silver Medal
- 2010: François Renaud, CNRS Silver Medal

== Management ==
- Didier Fontenille (Director, 2013–2014)
- Frédéric Simard (Director, 2015–present)

== See also ==
- CNRS (French National Centre for Scientific Research)
- IRD (Research Institute for Development)
- University of Montpellier
