= Echezona =

Echezona is both a given name and a surname. Notable people with the name include:

- Echezona Anyichie (born 1990), Nigerian footballer
- Wilberforce Echezona (1926–1987), Nigerian musicologist
- ThankGod Echezona Ebenezer, Nigerian bioinformatician
