= Swamp musk shrew =

Conservation status
- Least Concern (IUCN 3.1)

Scientific classification
- Kingdom: Animalia
- Phylum: Chordata
- Class: Mammalia
- Order: Eulipotyphla
- Family: Soricidae
- Genus: Crocidura
- Species: C. mariquensis

Binomial name
- Crocidura mariquensis (A. Smith, 1844)
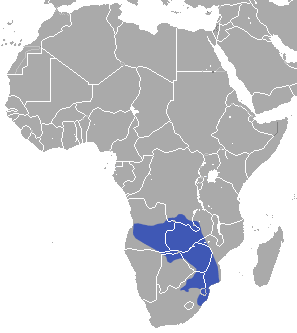
- Swamp musk shrew range

Species of mammal native to African swamps

The swamp musk shrew (Crocidura mariquensis), or musk shrew, is a species of mammal in the family Soricidae. It occurs in Angola, Botswana, Democratic Republic of the Congo, Mozambique, Namibia, South Africa, Eswatini, Zambia and Zimbabwe. Its natural habitat is swamps, and it is a common species in suitable habitats, with the International Union for Conservation of Nature listing it as being of "least concern".

== Description ==
This is a moderate-sized shrew growing to a head-and-body length of about 80 mm (3 in) with a tail of around 60 mm (2.4 in), males being slightly larger than females. The head is long and narrow, with a sharply pointed snout, small eyes and rounded ears. The dorsal pelage is blackish-brown tinged with rust, the individual hairs having greyish bases, brownish bands and brownish-black tips. The ventral surface is paler greyish-brown, there being no clear demarcation between dorsal and ventral fur. The tail is about 70% of the head-and-body length, and is partially haired and some shade of brown, sometimes paler below. Both fore and hind feet are yellowish-brown, reddish-brown or dark brown, and the digits of the hind feet splay apart when the animal is walking. There is considerable variation in colouring over the shrew's range.

== Distribution and habitat ==
The musk shrew is native to southern Africa, where its range extends from Angola and the southern Democratic Republic of the Congo, through Zambia, northeastern Namibia and northern Botswana, to Zimbabwe, southern Mozambique, Eswatini and northeastern South Africa. It has a requirement for a wetland habitat and occurs in reed beds and semi-aquatic vegetation, in the vicinity of rivers and lakes and in seasonally flooded areas, with a marked preference for marshes and swamps.

== Ecology ==
The musk shrew is mainly nocturnal, although it may occasionally be active during the day. It clambers around among the aquatic vegetation with agility; it is not aggressive to other members of its species and does not scent mark its surroundings. In captivity it will feed on snails and termites, but does not dig into the ground to forage. In its natural surroundings, nests have been observed in grass tussocks and in debris above the surface of the ground. Breeding mostly takes place in the wet season, with litters averaging three to four young. It is predated upon by the southern fiscal, the barn owl and the African grass owl.

== Conservation status ==
This shrew was classified as "near threatened" in 2016 by South African National Bioinformatics Institute; however, it has a wide range, is presumed to have a stable and large total population, and faces no particular threats, so the International Union for Conservation of Nature has assessed its conservation status as being of "least concern".
