= Anna Tramontano =

Italian computational biologist

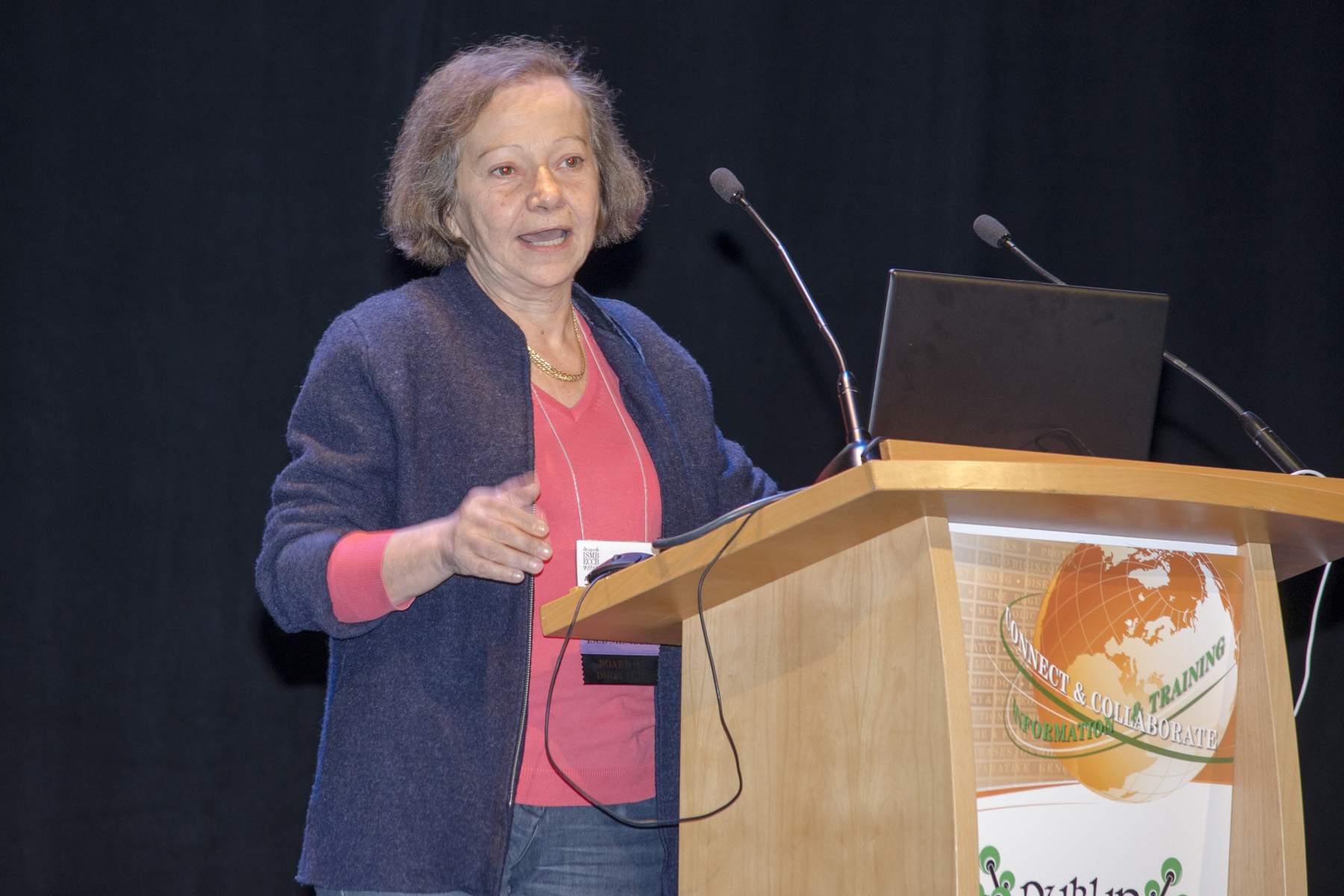
- Anna Tramontano speaking at the ISMB conference in 2015.
- Born: 14 July 1957; Naples, Italy
- Died: 10 March 2017 (aged 59); Rome, Italy
- Education: University of California, San Francisco
- Alma mater: University of Naples Federico II
- Scientific career
- Workplaces: International Institute of Genetics and Biophysics; Sapienza University of Rome; European Research Council (ERC)

Anna Tramontano (14 July 1957 – 10 March 2017) was an Italian computational biologist and chair professor of biochemistry at the Sapienza University of Rome. From 2011 to 2014 she was a member of the Scientific Council of the European Research Council (ERC). She was an associate editor for the journal Bioinformatics from 2005 until 2016 editing papers in the area of structural bioinformatics.

== Education ==
Tramontano originally trained as a physicist, gaining her PhD from the University of Naples Federico II in 1980. She was later drawn to the field of computational biology and carried out postdoctoral studies at the University of California, San Francisco where she developed the molecular graphics package InsightII. She later joined the biocomputing programme at the European Molecular Biology Laboratory in Heidelberg to work with Arthur Lesk on analysis and modelling of antibodies.

== Awards and honours ==
Tramontano served as vice-president of the International Society for Computational Biology (ISCB), and was elected a Fellow of the ISCB in 2016. She served on the ISCB Board of Directors since its beginning, and was a Senior Member of the ISCB for many years.

== Capacity building in Computational Biology ==
Tramontano actively engaged in computational biology capacity building particularly for developing countries. She supported capacity building efforts of one of the regional student groups (RSG Eastern Africa) affiliated to the ISCB Student Council (ISCBSC) by giving a 3-day course. She traveled to Nairobi, Kenya and sponsored students from the neighboring region (Uganda and Tanzania) to attend a 3-day Proteomics course that she taught. In addition, she connected students from Africa interested in Bioinformatics to various labs in Europe, including her own, for internships or advanced study.

She later went on to assist in securing a King Abdullah University of Science and Technology (KAUST) funding for a large number of travel fellowships that were awarded to students from Africa to attend the ISCB Africa ASBCB Conference on Bioinformatics held in Bamako, Mali in 2009.
