= Deanna M. Church =

American economist

Deanna Church
- Citizenship: United States
- Education: University of California, Irvine
- Known for: Genomics
- Scientific career
- Fields: Bioinformatics
- Workplaces: 10x Genomics; National Center for Biotechnology Information
- Doctoral advisor: John J. Wasmuth

Deanna Church is a scientist working in the areas of bioinformatics and genomics. She is known for her work on the human genome, "making the genome a friendlier place".

== Life ==
Church graduated with a bachelor's degree from the University of Virginia in 1990. She received a doctorate in genomics from University of California, Irvine in 1997. At the Samuel Lunenfeld Research Institute, Church completed her postdoctoral training in the field of developmental biology under the mentorship of Dr. Janet Rossant. Church describes her passion for bioinformatics as connected to her enjoyment of problem solving and being in a team that has direct impacts on people's medical care.

== Work ==
Church worked for the National Center for Biotechnology Information (NCBI) from 1999 until 2013. While there, she headed NCBI's team in the Genome Reference Consortium, an international group focusing on refining data on the human genome. She was part of the group involved in releasing GRCh38, a build of the human genome that included centromere sequences for the first time.

In 2013, she joined Personalis as Senior Director of Genomics and Content where she worked towards improving bioinformatics for better analysis of the human genome.

In 2016, she joined 10x Genomics as Senior Director of Applications. Church has had over 35 publications in her career.

Deanna continued her work with human genomes and in 2019, published "Multi-platform discovery of haplotype-resolved structural variation in human genomes," along with other researchers.

== See also ==
- Human Genome Project
- Mouse Genome Informatics
