= African Society for Bioinformatics and Computational Biology =

Professional body for bioinformatics and computational biology in Africa

- Abbreviation: ASBCB
- Formation: 2004
- Founded at: Cape Town, South Africa
- Type: Non-profit organisation
- Purpose: Professional association for bioinformatics and computational biology in Africa
- Region served: Africa
- Services: Professional membership Networking; Research projects Conferences
- Fields: Bioinformatics; Computational Biology
- Affiliations: International Society for Computational Biology

The African Society for Bioinformatics and Computational Biology (ASBCB) is a non-profit professional association dedicated to the advancement of bioinformatics and computational biology in Africa.

== Origins ==
ASBCB was established in February 2004 at a meeting in Cape Town, South Africa.

== Activities ==
The Society serves as an international forum and resource devoted to developing competence and expertise in bioinformatics and computational biology in Africa. It complements its activities with those of other international and national societies, associations and institutions, public and private, that have similar aims. It also promotes the standing of African bioinformatics and computational biology in the global arena through liaison and cooperation with other international bodies.

=== Affiliation ===
It is an affiliated regional group of the International Society for Computational Biology (ISCB).

=== Supporting national activities ===
The ASBCB supports the development of bioiniformatics and computational biology at a national level across Africa, including in Ghana, Nigeria, South Africa and Zimbabwe.

=== International projects ===
Many of the most important applications of bioininformatics and computational biology in Africa relate to human genetic diversity, which does not match national boundaries. The ASBCB supports international projects with this focus, such as the H3ABioNet network. Although the H3BioNet project has finished it was successful in supporting the improvement of bioinformatics in Africa and continues to supply services to the African bioinformatics and computational biology community, including DSI-Africa (Data Science for Health Discovery and Innovation in Africa) which focuses on the data science techniques needed to manage the huge amount of data generated by current bioinformatics. H3ABioNet has also supported Introduction to Bionformatics Training(IBT) courses delivered remotely across Africa.

In collaboration with the US National Center for Biotechnology Information and the European Bioinformatics Institute (EMBL-EBI) the ASBCB has organised online activities to improve the skills of African scientists using the computational tools essential for bioinformatics These activities are part of those needed to increase proficiency in bioinformatics among African students. In conjunction with other panAfrican initiatives such as the African BioGenome Project the ASBCB supports initiatives needed to increase bioinformatics resources in Africa.

=== Communities ===
The ASBCB has extablished six Communities of Special Interest (COSIs) which reflect the different specialisations of members of the organisation, as well as emphasizing topics particularly relevant to Africa. These are:

CoSI title	Description
Pathogen Genomics	Africa has a diversity of pathogens presenting risks to human and non-human hosts. Bioinformatics offers new ways to tackle them, which is what this CoSI focuses upon.
Population Genomics	This CoSI describes itself as "AfriPopGen and Human Variation CoSI" showing its focus on the distinctive variation of human populations in Africa.
Agricultural Bioinformatics	This CoSI focuses on the application of bioinformatics to agriculture in Africa, a continent with some crops common to other parts of the world and others distinct.
MetaOmics	Bioinformatics in Africa as elsewhere in the world can draw information from sequencing of proteins, RNA and other biological material, as well as genetic material. This CoSI focuses upon this.
Structural Bioinformatics	This CoSI focuses on protein structure databases relevant to Africa.
Systems Administration	The success of bioinformatics and computational biology in Africa as elsewhere depends on the efforts of system administrators, which is what this CoSI focuses on.

=== Conferences ===
Since 2007 it has hosted the ISCB Africa ASBCB Conference on Bioinformatics at different locations in Africa to bring together scientists working in bioinformatics from different African nations together with other international researchers in the field.

== See also ==
Bioinformatics is a diverse and active field. See Bioinformatics below to read about its many directions.

Because the application of bionformatics in Africa is very much related to regional human genetic diversity on that continent see also Human genetics below to learn more.
