= ZNG1B =

Protein-coding gene in humans

Identifiers
- Aliases: ZNG1B, COBW domain containing 2, CBWD2, Zn regulated GTPase metalloprotein activator 1B
- External IDs: OMIM: 611079; MGI: 2385089; GeneCards: ZNG1B

Gene location (Human)
Chr.	Chromosome 2 (human)
Band	2q14.1	Start	113,437,691 bp
Band	2q14.1	End	113,496,204 bp

Gene location (Mouse)
Chr.	Chromosome 19 (mouse)
Band	19|19 B	Start	24,897,280 bp
Band	19|19 B	End	24,938,974 bp
RNA expression pattern
Bgee	Human / Mouse (ortholog); Top expressed in: monocyte; islet of Langerhans; anterior pituitary; right adrenal cortex; body of pancreas; left adrenal gland; left adrenal cortex; left lobe of thyroid gland; gastrocnemius muscle; left ventricle / Top expressed in: spermatocyte; morula; spermatid; seminiferous tubule; tail of embryo; primitive streak; interventricular septum; lumbar spinal ganglion; muscle of thigh; embryo; More reference expression data
BioGPS	n/a
Orthologs
Databases	NCBI: entry; OMA: entry
Species	Human	Mouse
Entrez	150472	226043
Ensembl	ENSG00000136682	ENSMUSG00000024878
UniProt	Q8IUF1	Q8VEH6
RefSeq (mRNA)	NM_172003; NM_001330336; NM_001330337; NM_001330339; NM_001330340 NM_001330342	NM_146097
RefSeq (protein)	NP_001317265; NP_001317266; NP_001317268; NP_001317269; NP_001317271 NP_742000	NP_666209
Location (UCSC)	Chr 2: 113.44 – 113.5 Mb	Chr 19: 24.9 – 24.94 Mb
PubMed search
- Wikidata
View/Edit Human	View/Edit Mouse

COBW domain containing 2 is a protein that in humans is encoded by the CBWD2 gene. Like ZNG1A, research in mice suggests that this protein activates metalloproteins like METAP1 by transferring zinc to them.
