= Genome Reference Consortium =

Science collective

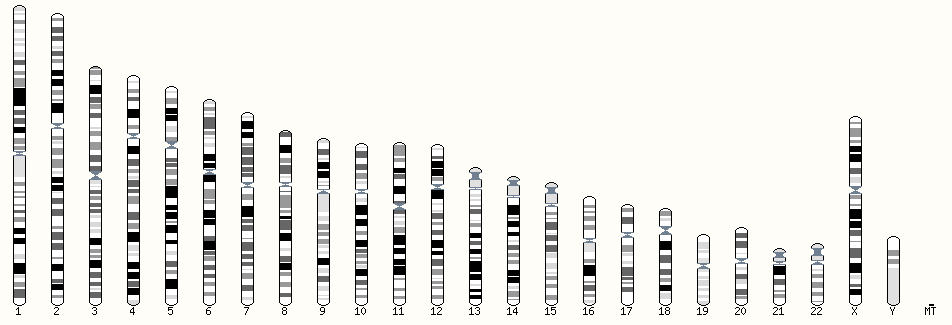
Human whole reference genome from the assembly GRCh38/hg38 (Genome Reference Consortium Human Build 38).

The Genome Reference Consortium (GRC) is an international collective of academic and research institutes with expertise in genome mapping, sequencing, and informatics, formed to improve the representation of reference genomes. At the time the human reference was initially described, it was clear that some regions were recalcitrant to analysis with existing technology, leaving gaps in the known sequence. The main reason for improving the reference assemblies are that they are the cornerstones upon which all whole genome studies are based (e.g. the 1000 Genomes Project).

The GRC is a collaborative effort which interacts with various groups in the scientific community. The primary member institutes are:

- The Wellcome Sanger Institute
- The McDonnell Genome Institute at Washington University
- The European Bioinformatics Institute
- The National Center for Biotechnology Information
- Zebrafish Model Organism Database
- Rat Genome Database

The goal of the Consortium is to correct the small number of regions in the reference that are currently misrepresented, to close as many remaining gaps as possible and to produce alternative assemblies of structurally variant loci when necessary. Initially the focus was on the human and mouse reference genomes, but in expansions new organisms were added to the consortium. In October 2010 full maintenance and improvement of the zebrafish genome sequence was added to the GRC; in 2015, after the release of the chicken genome assembly Gallus_gallus-5.0, GRC added the chicken reference genome, and in November 2020 the rat genome assembly was added.

As of September 2019, the major assembly releases for human, mouse, zebrafish, and chicken are GRCh38, GRCm38, GRCz11, and GRCg6a, respectively. Major assembly releases do not follow a fixed cycle; however, there are minor assembly updates in the form of genome patches which either correct errors in the assembly or add additional alternate loci. These assemblies are represented in various genome browsers and databases including Ensembl, those in NCBI and UCSC Genome Browser.

== Notable staff ==
- Deanna M. Church, bioinformatics and genomics researcher.
- Richard Durbin, computational biologist at the University of Cambridge.
- Tim Hubbard, computational biologist at the King's College London and Head of Genome Analysis in Genomics England.
