= Chimpanzee genome project =

Effort to determine the DNA sequence of the chimpanzee genome

The Chimpanzee Genome Project was an effort to determine the DNA sequence of the chimpanzee genome. Sequencing began in 2005 and by 2013 twenty-four individual chimpanzees had been sequenced. This project was folded into the Great Ape Genome Project.

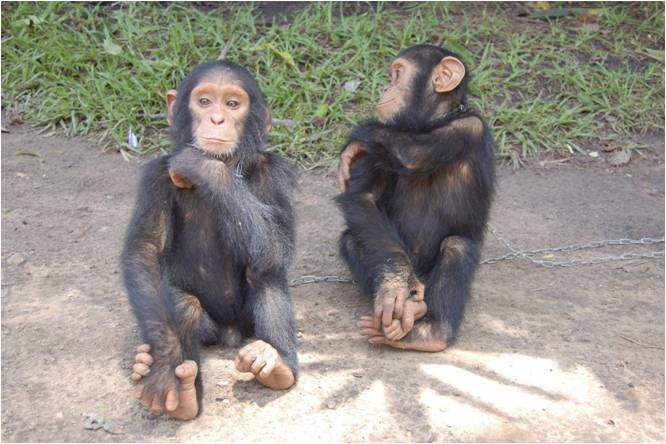
Two juvenile central chimpanzees, the nominate subspecies

In 2013 high resolution sequences were published from each of the four recognized chimpanzee subspecies: Central chimpanzee, Pan troglodytes troglodytes, 10 sequences; Western chimpanzee, Pan troglodytes verus, 6 sequences; Nigeria-Cameroon chimpanzee, Pan troglodytes ellioti, 4 sequences; and Eastern chimpanzee, Pan troglodytes schweinfurthii, 4 sequences. They were all sequenced to a mean of 25-fold coverage per individual.

The research showed considerable genome diversity in chimpanzees with many population-specific traits. The central chimpanzees retain the highest diversity in the chimpanzee lineage, whereas the other subspecies demonstrate signs of population bottlenecks.

== Background ==
Human and chimpanzee chromosomes are very alike. The primary difference is that humans have one fewer pair of chromosomes than do other great apes. Humans have 23 pairs of chromosomes and other great apes have 24 pairs of chromosomes. In the human evolutionary lineage, two ancestral ape chromosomes fused at their telomeres, producing human chromosome 2. There are nine other major chromosomal differences between chimpanzees and humans: chromosome segment inversions on human chromosomes 1, 4, 5, 9, 12, 15, 16, 17, and 18. After the completion of the Human Genome Project, a common chimpanzee genome project was initiated. In December 2003, a preliminary analysis of 7600 genes shared between the two genomes confirmed that certain genes such as the forkhead-box P2 transcription factor, which is involved in speech development, are different in the human lineage. Several genes involved in hearing were also found to have changed during human evolution, suggesting selection involving human language-related behavior. Differences between individual humans and common chimpanzees are estimated to be about 10 times the typical difference between pairs of humans.

Another study showed that patterns of DNA methylation, which are a known regulation mechanism for gene expression, differ in the prefrontal cortex of humans versus chimpanzees, and implicated this difference in the evolutionary divergence of the two species.

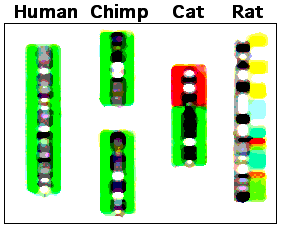
Chimpanzee-human chromosome differences. A major structural difference is that human chromosome 2 (green color code) was derived from two smaller chromosomes that are found in other great apes (now called 2A and 2B). Parts of human chromosome 2 are scattered among parts of several cat and rat chromosomes in these species that are more distantly related to humans (more ancient common ancestors; about 85 million years since the human/rodent common ancestor

== Draft genome sequence of the common chimpanzee ==
An analysis of the chimpanzee genome sequence was published in Nature on September 1, 2005, in an article produced by the Chimpanzee Sequencing and Analysis Consortium, a group of scientists which is supported in part by the National Human Genome Research Institute, one of the National Institutes of Health. The article marked the completion of the draft genome sequence.

A database now exists containing the genetic differences between human and chimpanzee genes, with about thirty-five million single-nucleotide changes, five million insertion/deletion events, and various chromosomal rearrangements. Gene duplications account for most of the sequence differences between humans and chimps. Single-base-pair substitutions account for about half as much genetic change as does gene duplication.

Typical human and chimpanzee homologs of proteins differ in only an average of two amino acids. About 30 percent of all human proteins are identical in sequence to the corresponding chimpanzee protein. As mentioned above, gene duplications are a major source of differences between human and chimpanzee genetic material, with about 2.7 percent of the genome now representing differences having been produced by gene duplications or deletions during approximately 6 million years since humans and chimpanzees diverged from their common evolutionary ancestor. The comparable variation within human populations is 0.5 percent.

About 600 genes were identified that may have been undergoing strong positive selection in the human and chimpanzee lineages; many of these genes are involved in immune system defense against microbial disease (example: granulysin is protective against Mycobacterium tuberculosis) or are targeted receptors of pathogenic microorganisms (example: Glycophorin C and Plasmodium falciparum). By comparing human and chimpanzee genes to the genes of other mammals, it has been found that genes coding for transcription factors. Forkhead box protein P2, the so-called 'language' gene FOXP2, was found to be functionally different in humans compared to chimpanzees. Since FOXP2 was also found to have an effect on other genes, its effects on other genes is also being studied. While FOXP2 has been proposed to play a critical role in the development of speech and language, this view has been challenged by the fact that the gene is also expressed in other mammals such as chimpanzees that do not speak. It has also been proposed that the FOXP2 transcription-factor is not so much a hypothetical 'language gene' but rather part of a regulatory machinery related to externalization of speech.

Six human chromosomal regions were found that may have been under particularly strong and coordinated selection during the past 250,000 years. These regions contain at least one marker allele that seems unique to the human lineage while the entire chromosomal region shows lower than normal genetic variation. This pattern suggests that one or a few strongly selected genes in the chromosome region may have been preventing the random accumulation of neutral changes in other nearby genes. One such region on chromosome 7 contains the FOXP2 gene and this region also includes the Cystic fibrosis transmembrane conductance regulator (CFTR) gene, which is important for ion transport in tissues such as the salt-secreting epithelium of sweat glands. Human mutations in the CFTR gene might be selected for as a way to survive cholera.

Another such region on chromosome 4 may contain elements regulating the expression of a nearby protocadherin gene that may be important for brain development and function. Although changes in expression of genes that are expressed in the brain tend to be less than for other organs (such as liver) on average, gene expression changes in the brain have been more dramatic in the human lineage than in the chimpanzee lineage. This is consistent with the dramatic divergence of the unique pattern of human brain development seen in the human lineage compared to the ancestral great ape pattern. The protocadherin-beta gene cluster on chromosome 5 also shows evidence of possible positive selection.

Results from the human and chimpanzee genome analyses should help in understanding some human diseases. Humans appear to have lost a functional Caspase 12 gene, which in other primates codes for an enzyme that may protect against Alzheimer's disease.

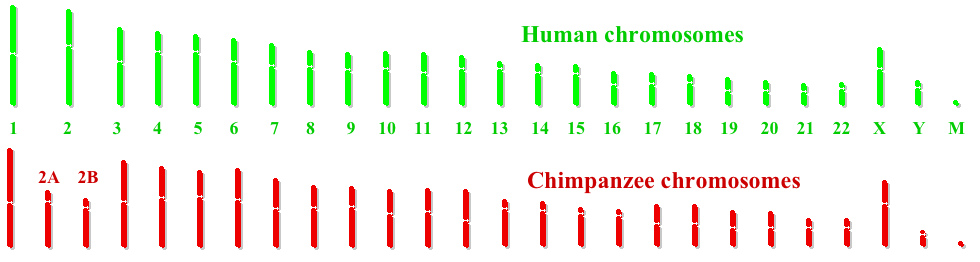
Human and chimpanzee genomes. M stands for Mitochondrial DNA

== Genes of the chromosome 2 fusion site ==
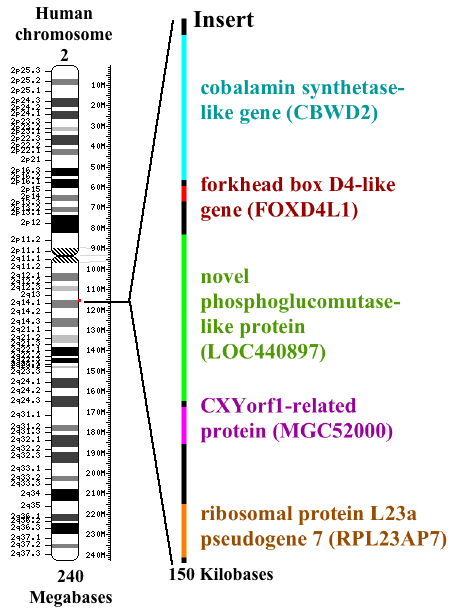
Diagramatic representation of the location of the fusion site of chromosomes 2A and 2B and the genes inserted at this location.

The results of the chimpanzee genome project suggest that when ancestral chromosomes 2A and 2B fused to produce human chromosome 2, no genes were lost from the fused ends of 2A and 2B. At the site of fusion, there are approximately 150,000 base pairs of sequence not found in chimpanzee chromosomes 2A and 2B. Additional linked copies of the PGML/FOXD/CBWD genes exist elsewhere in the human genome, particularly near the p end of chromosome 9. This suggests that a copy of these genes may have been added to the end of the ancestral 2A or 2B prior to the fusion event. It remains to be determined if these inserted genes confer a selective advantage.

- PGM5P4. The phosphoglucomutase pseudogene of human chromosome 2. This gene is incomplete and doesn't produce a functional transcript.
- FOXD4L1. The forkhead box D4-like gene is an example of an intronless gene. The function of this gene is not known, but it may code for a transcription control protein.
- CBWD2. Cobalamin synthetase is a bacterial enzyme that makes vitamin B_{12}. In the distant past, a common ancestor to mice and apes incorporated a copy of a cobalamin synthetase gene (see: Horizontal gene transfer). Humans are unusual in that they have several copies of cobalamin synthetase-like genes, including the one on chromosome 2. It remains to be determined what the function of these human cobalamin synthetase-like genes is. If these genes are involved in vitamin B_{12} metabolism, this could be relevant to human evolution. A major change in human development is greater post-natal brain growth than is observed in other apes. Vitamin B_{12} is important for brain development, and vitamin B_{12} deficiency during brain development results in severe neurological defects in human children.
- WASH2P. Several transcripts of unknown function corresponding to this region have been isolated. This region is also present in the closely related chromosome 9p terminal region that contains copies of the PGML/FOXD/CBWD genes.
- RPL23AP7. Many ribosomal protein L23a pseudogenes are scattered through the human genome.

== Proteome ==
The chimpanzee proteome is described in the paper by Yufan Wang titled "The Chimpanzee Brainnetome Atlas reveals distinct connectivity and gene expression profiles relative to humans." Chimpanzee proteomics is the large-scale study of proteins found in chimpanzees. It is an interdisciplinary domain that has benefited greatly from the genetic information of various genome projects, including the Human Genome Project. Forkhead box protein P2 (FOXP2) is a protein that, on chromosome 7 in humans, is encoded by the FOXP2 gene. Three amino acid substitutions distinguish the human FOXP2 protein from that found in mice, while two amino acid substitutions distinguish the human FOXP2 protein from that found in chimpanzees, but only one of these changes is unique to humans.

== See also ==
- Human evolutionary genetics
- Human Genome Project
