= ThankGod Echezona Ebenezer =

Nigerian biologist and academic

- Born: South East, Nigeria
- Education: University of Cambridge
- Known for: Founder of the African BioGenome Project; President of the Euglena International Network
- Scientific career
- Fields: Bioinformatics Genomics
- Workplaces: European Bioinformatics Institute

ThankGod Echezona Ebenezer is a Nigerian bioinformatician.

== Career ==
Ebenezer is from South East Nigeria. He earned a Ph.D. from Churchill College at the University of Cambridge. He worked as a postdoctoral researcher under Wilfried Haerty at the Earlham Institute, and later moved to the European Bioinformatics Institute.

== Professional activities ==
While at EBI, Ebenezer served as the founding president of the Euglena International Network, an effort to support omics research on euglenoids. He also founded the African BioGenome Project, an effort to sequence the genomes of all African eukaryotes.

The African BioGenome Project is a pan-African research initiative that aims to sequence the genomes of Africa's endemic and indigenous plant and animal species.
