= Infection, Genetics and Evolution =

- Discipline: Microbiology
- Language: English
- Edited by: Michel Tibayrenc

Publication details
- History: 2001–present
- Publisher: Elsevier
- Frequency: 8/year
- Impact factor: 2.6 (2023)

Standard abbreviations
- ISO 4: Infect. Genet. Evol.

Indexing
- ISSN: 1567-1348 (print); 1567-7257 (web)
- LCCN: 2001243317
- OCLC no.: 48132747

Links
- Journal homepage; Online access

Infection, Genetics and Evolution, Journal of Molecular Epidemiology and Evolutionary Genetics of Infectious Diseases is a peer-reviewed scientific journal established in 2001. It is published by Elsevier. The (founding) editor-in-chief is Michel Tibayrenc. Topics covered include genetics, population genetics, genomics, gene expression, evolutionary biology, population dynamics, mathematical modeling, and bioinformatics.

== Abstracting and indexing ==
Infection, Genetics and Evolution is abstracted and indexed in:

- BIOSIS Previews
- CAB Abstracts
- EMBASE
- Elsevier BIOBASE
- Global Health
- Scopus
- MEDLINE
- The Zoological Record
- Science Citation Index Expanded

According to the NLM Catalog, the journal has been indexed in MEDLINE and PubMed since volume 1, issue 1 (July 2001), and is currently indexed for MEDLINE. According to the Journal Citation Reports, the journal has a 2022 impact factor of 3.2.
