= African BioGenome Project =

Genome project cataloging Africa's eukaryotic species

The African BioGenome Project, or AfricaBP, is an international effort to sequence the genomes of all animals, all plants, all fungi, and all protists (and so, collectively, all eukaryotes) that are native to Africa at an estimated cost of $1 billion U.S. dollars. The project prioritizes doing its sequencing work and data storage within the African continent.

== Background ==
The project was originally started by a group of scientists including ThankGod Echezona Ebenezer, and has partnered with other major sequencing efforts such as the Vertebrate Genomes Project and the 10,000 Plant Genomes Project.
