= South African National Bioinformatics Institute =

Research institute within the University of the Western Cape, South Africa

- Formation: 1996; 29 years ago
- Founder: Winston Hide
- Type: nonprofit organisation
- Purpose: bioinformatics biotechnology genomics health research
- Headquarters: Cape Town, South Africa
- Coordinates: 33.9316406°S 18.6244322°E
- Website: www.sanbi.ac.za

The South African National Bioinformatics Institute (SANBI) is a non-profit organisation in Cape Town, South Africa dedicated to bioinformatics, biotechnology and genomics in health research.

SANBI maintains current collaborations with institutes and laboratories at Harvard University, Oxford University, Cambridge University, Stanford University, the Pasteur Institute, the RIKEN institute, the Allen Institute for Brain Science, the Institut National de la Santé et de la Recherche Médicale and the European Bioinformatics Institute.

SANBI is the South African national node of the European Molecular Biology Network, the regional site for the World Health Organization African centre for training in pathogen bioinformatics, and an affiliate of the Ludwig Institute for Cancer Research.

SANBI is funded by several organisations including the South African Medical Research Council, the National Research Foundation of South Africa, the Claude Leon Foundation, the John E. Fogarty Foundation for International Health at the National Institutes of Health, and the European Commission.

SANBI was founded in 1996 by computational biologist Winston Hide, the founding director, as part of the faculty of Natural Sciences of the University of the Western Cape. The SANBI research team includes faculty in the areas of genetic diversity, gene regulation, cancer, sleeping sickness and the Human Immunodeficiency Virus.

== See also ==
- Computational biology
