= Sequence Read Archive =

Database of DNA sequencing data

Content
- Description: FASTQ Sequences; BAM data
- Organisms: all

Contact
- Research center: National Center for Biotechnology Information; European Bioinformatics Institute; DNA Data Bank of Japan

Access
- Website: www.ncbi.nlm.nih.gov/sra/ www.ebi.ac.uk/ena/ trace.ddbj.nig.ac.jp/dra/index_e.html

The Sequence Read Archive (SRA, previously known as the Short Read Archive) is a bioinformatics database that provides a public repository for DNA sequencing data, especially the "short reads" generated by high-throughput sequencing, which are typically less than 1,000 base pairs in length. The archive is part of the International Nucleotide Sequence Database Collaboration (INSDC), and run as a collaboration between the NCBI, the European Bioinformatics Institute (EBI), and the DNA Data Bank of Japan (DDBJ).

The archive was established by the National Center for Biotechnology Information (NCBI) in 2007 in order to provide a repository for data produced by RNA-Seq and ChIP-Seq studies as well as large-scale studies including the Human Microbiome Project and the 1000 Genomes Project. Originally called the Short Read Archive, the name was changed in anticipation of future sequencing technologies being able to produce longer sequence reads.

The SRA has grown rapidly since 2008. As of 2011, most SRA sequence data was produced by Illumina's Genome Analyzer.

The volume of data deposited in the Sequence Read Archive has grown rapidly. As of September 2010, 65% of the SRA was human genomic sequence, with another 16% relating to human metagenome sequence reads. Much of this data was deposited through the 1000 Genomes Project. In June 2011, the data contained within the SRA passed 100 Terabases of DNA in volume.

The preferred data format for files submitted to the SRA is the BAM format, which is capable of storing both aligned and unaligned reads. Internally the SRA relies on the NCBI SRA Toolkit, used at all three INSDC member databases, to provide flexible data compression, API access and conversion to other formats such as FASTQ.

NCBI announced their plan to close the NCBI SRA in February 2011 due to funding reduction. However, EBI and DDBJ announced that they would continue to support the SRA. In October 2011, NCBI announced continuation of funding for the SRA.

Deposition of data in the SRA is mandated by most funding agencies and open access journals. Nature Publishing Group journals require that DNA and RNA sequencing data is made available through the SRA.

== See also ==
- List of biological databases
