= Computational genomics =

Field of study in genomics

Computational genomics refers to the use of computational and statistical analysis to decipher biology from genome sequences and related data, including both DNA and RNA sequence as well as other "post-genomic" data (i.e., experimental data obtained with technologies that require the genome sequence, such as genomic DNA microarrays). These, in combination with computational and statistical approaches to understanding the function of the genes and statistical association analysis, this field is also often referred to as Computational and Statistical Genetics/genomics. As such, computational genomics may be regarded as a subset of bioinformatics and computational biology, but with a focus on using whole genomes (rather than individual genes) to understand the principles of how the DNA of a species controls its biology at the molecular level and beyond. With the current abundance of massive biological datasets, computational studies have become one of the most important means to biological discovery.

== History ==
The roots of computational genomics are shared with those of bioinformatics. During the 1960s, Margaret Dayhoff and others at the National Biomedical Research Foundation assembled databases of homologous protein sequences for evolutionary study. Their research developed a phylogenetic tree that determined the evolutionary changes that were required for a particular protein to change into another protein based on the underlying amino acid sequences. This led them to create a scoring matrix that assessed the likelihood of one protein being related to another.

Beginning in the 1980s, databases of genome sequences began to be recorded, but this presented new challenges in the form of searching and comparing the databases of gene information. Unlike text-searching algorithms that are used on websites such as Google or Wikipedia, searching for sections of genetic similarity requires one to find strings that are not simply identical, but similar. This led to the development of the Needleman-Wunsch algorithm, which is a dynamic programming algorithm for comparing sets of amino acid sequences with each other by using scoring matrices derived from the earlier research by Dayhoff. Later, the BLAST algorithm was developed for performing fast, optimized searches of gene sequence databases. BLAST and its derivatives are probably the most widely used algorithms for this purpose.

The emergence of the phrase "computational genomics" coincides with the availability of complete sequenced genomes in the mid-to-late 1990s. The first meeting of the Annual Conference on Computational Genomics was organized by scientists from The Institute for Genomic Research (TIGR) in 1998, providing a forum for this speciality and effectively distinguishing this area of science from the more general fields of Genomics or Computational Biology. The first use of this term in scientific literature, according to MEDLINE abstracts, was just one year earlier in Nucleic Acids Research. The final Computational Genomics conference was held in 2006, featuring a keynote talk by Nobel Laureate Barry Marshall, co-discoverer of the link between Helicobacter pylori and stomach ulcers. As of 2014, the leading conferences in the field include Intelligent Systems for Molecular Biology (ISMB) and Research in Computational Molecular Biology (RECOMB).

The development of computer-assisted mathematics (using products such as Mathematica or Matlab) has helped engineers, mathematicians and computer scientists to start operating in this domain, and a public collection of case studies and demonstrations is growing, ranging from whole genome comparisons to gene expression analysis. This has increased the introduction of different ideas, including concepts from systems and control, information theory, strings analysis and data mining. It is anticipated that computational approaches will become and remain a standard topic for research and teaching, while students fluent in both topics start being formed in the multiple courses created in the past few years.

== Contributions of computational genomics research to biology ==
Contributions of computational genomics research to biology include:

- proposing cellular signalling networks
- proposing mechanisms of genome evolution
- predict precise locations of all human genes using comparative genomics techniques with several mammalian and vertebrate species
- predict conserved genomic regions that are related to early embryonic development
- discover potential links between repeated sequence motifs and tissue-specific gene expression
- measure regions of genomes that have undergone unusually rapid evolution

== Genome comparison ==
Computational tools have been developed to assess the similarity of genomic sequences. Some of them are alignment-based distances such as Average Nucleotide Identity. These methods are highly specific, while being computationally slow. Other, alignment-free methods, include statistical and probabilistic approaches. One example is Mash, a probabilistic approach using minhash. In this method, given a number k, a genomic sequence is transformed into a shorter sketch through a random hash function on the possible k-mers. For example, if $k=2$, sketches of size 4 are being constructed and given the following hash function

(AA,0)	(AC,8)	(AT,2)	(AG,14)
(CA,6)	(CC,13)	(CT,5)	(CG,4)
(GA,15)	(GC,12)	(GT,10)	(GG,1)
(TA,3)	(TC,11)	(TT,9)	(TG,7)

the sketch of the sequence

CTGACCTTAACGGGAGACTATGATGACGACCGCAT

is {0,1,1,2} which are the smallest hash values of its k-mers of size 2. These sketches are then compared to estimate the fraction of shared k-mers (Jaccard index) of the corresponding sequences. It is worth noticing that a hash value is a binary number. In a real genomic setting a useful size of k-mers ranges from 14 to 21, and the size of the sketches would be around 1000.

By reducing the size of the sequences, even hundreds of times, and comparing them in an alignment-free way, this method reduces significantly the time of estimation of the similarity of sequences.

== Clusterization of genomic data ==
Clustering data is a tool used to simplify statistical analysis of a genomic sample. For example, in the authors developed a tool (BiG-SCAPE) to analyze sequence similarity networks of biosynthetic gene clusters (BGC). In successive layers of clusterization of biosynthetic gene clusters are used in the automated tool BiG-MAP, both to filter redundant data and identify gene clusters families. This tool profiles the abundance and expressions levels of BGC's in microbiome samples.

== Biosynthetic gene clusters ==
Bioinformatic tools have been developed to predict, and determine the abundance and expression of, this kind of gene cluster in microbiome samples, from metagenomic data. Since the size of metagenomic data is considerable, filtering and clusterization thereof are important parts of these tools. These processes can consist of dimensionality -reduction techniques, such as Minhash, and clusterization algorithms such as k-medoids and affinity propagation. Also several metrics and similarities have been developed to compare them.

Genome mining for biosynthetic gene clusters (BGCs) has become an integral part of natural product discovery. The >200,000 microbial genomes now publicly available hold information on abundant novel chemistry. One way to navigate this vast genomic diversity is through comparative analysis of homologous BGCs, which allows identification of cross-species patterns that can be matched to the presence of metabolites or biological activities. However, current tools are hindered by a bottleneck caused by the expensive network-based approach used to group these BGCs into gene cluster families (GCFs). BiG-SLiCE (Biosynthetic Genes Super-Linear Clustering Engine), a tool designed to cluster massive numbers of BGCs. By representing them in Euclidean space, BiG-SLiCE can group BGCs into GCFs in a non-pairwise, near-linear fashion.

Satria et al., 2021 across BiG-SLiCE demonstrate the utility of such analyses by reconstructing a global map of secondary metabolic diversity across taxonomy to identify uncharted biosynthetic potential, opens up new possibilities to accelerate natural product discovery and offers a first step towards constructing a global and searchable interconnected network of BGCs. As more genomes are sequenced from understudied taxa, more information can be mined to highlight their potentially novel chemistry.

== Compression algorithms ==
Genetics compression algorithms are the latest generation of lossless algorithms that compress data (typically sequences of nucleotides) using both conventional compression algorithms and genetic algorithms adapted to the specific datatype. In 2012, a team of scientists from Johns Hopkins University published a genetic compression algorithm that does not use a reference genome for compression. HAPZIPPER was tailored for HapMap data and achieves over 20-fold compression (95% reduction in file size), providing 2- to 4-fold better compression and is less computationally intensive than the leading general-purpose compression utilities. For this, Chanda, Elhaik, and Bader introduced MAF-based encoding (MAFE), which reduces the heterogeneity of the dataset by sorting SNPs by their minor allele frequency, thus homogenizing the dataset. Other algorithms developed in 2009 and 2013 (DNAZip and GenomeZip) have compression ratios of up to 1200-fold—allowing 6 billion basepair diploid human genomes to be stored in 2.5 megabytes (relative to a reference genome or averaged over many genomes). For a benchmark in genetics/genomics data compressors, see

== See also ==
- Bioinformatics
- Computational biology
- Earth BioGenome Project
- Genomics
- Microarray
- BLAST
- Computational epigenetics
- Nvidia Parabricks - suite of free software for genome analysis developed by Nvidia
- List of Metagenomics software
- List of genomic re-sequencing data compression tools
