= Compression of genomic sequencing data =

Methods of compressing data tailored specifically for genomic data

In genomics, DNA sequencing is the process of converting information stored in nucleic acid into digital data that can be stored inside computers, and the amount of storage required can be reduced with loseless compression. As the rise of modern high throughput sequencing methods allow for more genetic material to be processed, the increased amount of data generated demands extra storage space, and more efficient methods of storage were desired. The application of computer science and mathematics into the field spawned new compression algorithms optimized specifically for the storage of genetic material. These technologies are enabling ambitious genome sequencing endeavours, such as the 1000 Genomes Project and 1001 (Arabidopsis thaliana) Genomes Project. The storage and transfer of the tremendous amount of genomic data have become a mainstream problem, motivating the development of high-performance compression tools designed specifically for genomic data. A recent surge of interest in the development of novel algorithms and tools for storing and managing genomic re-sequencing data emphasizes the growing demand for efficient methods for genomic data compression.

== General concepts ==
While standard data compression tools (e.g., zip and rar) are being used to compress sequence data (e.g., GenBank flat file database), this approach has been criticized to be extravagant because genomic sequences often contain repetitive content (e.g., microsatellite sequences) or many sequences exhibit high levels of similarity (e.g., multiple genome sequences from the same species). Additionally, the statistical and information-theoretic properties of genomic sequences can potentially be exploited for compressing sequencing data.

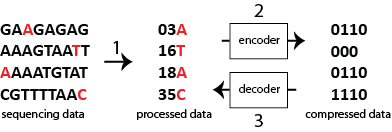
Figure 1: The principal steps of a workflow for compressing genomic re-sequencing data: (1) processing of the original sequencing data (e.g., reducing the original dataset to only variations relative to a specified reference sequence; (2) Encoding the processed data into binary form; and (3) decoding the data back to text form.

=== Base variants ===
With the availability of a reference template, only differences (e.g., single nucleotide substitutions and insertions/deletions) need to be recorded, thereby greatly reducing the amount of information to be stored. The notion of relative compression is obvious especially in genome re-sequencing projects where the aim is to discover variations in individual genomes. The use of a reference single nucleotide polymorphism (SNP) map, such as dbSNP, can be used to further improve the number of variants for storage.

=== Relative genomic coordinates ===
Another useful idea is to store relative genomic coordinates in lieu of absolute coordinates. For example, representing sequence variant bases in the format ‘Position1Base1Position2Base2…’, ‘123C125T130G’ can be shortened to ‘0C2T5G’, where the integers represent intervals between the variants. The cost is the modest arithmetic calculation required to recover the absolute coordinates plus the storage of the correction factor (‘123’ in this example).

=== Prior information about the genomes ===
Further reduction can be achieved if all possible positions of substitutions in a pool of genome sequences are known in advance. For instance, if all locations of SNPs in a human population are known, then there is no need to record variant coordinate information (e.g., ‘123C125T130G’ can be abridged to ‘CTG’). This approach, however, is rarely appropriate because such information is usually incomplete or unavailable.

=== Encoding genomic coordinates ===
Encoding schemes are used to convert coordinate integers into binary form to provide additional compression gains. Encoding designs, such as the Golomb code and the Huffman code, have been incorporated into genomic data compression tools. Of course, encoding schemes entail accompanying decoding algorithms. Choice of the decoding scheme potentially affects the efficiency of sequence information retrieval.

== Algorithm design choices ==
A universal approach to compressing genomic data may not necessarily be optimal, as a particular method may be more suitable for specific purposes and aims. Thus, several design choices that potentially impacts compression performance may be important for consideration.

=== Reference sequence ===
Selection of a reference sequence for relative compression can affect compression performance. Choosing a consensus reference sequence over a more specific reference sequence (e.g., the revised Cambridge Reference Sequence) can result in higher compression ratio because the consensus reference may contain less bias in its data. Knowledge about the source of the sequence being compressed, however, may be exploited to achieve greater compression gains. The idea of using multiple reference sequences has been proposed. Brandon et al. (2009) alluded to the potential use of ethnic group-specific reference sequence templates, using the compression of mitochondrial DNA variant data as an example (see Figure 2). The authors found biased haplotype distribution in the mitochondrial DNA sequences of Africans, Asians, and Eurasians relative to the revised Cambridge Reference Sequence. Their result suggests that the revised Cambridge Reference Sequence may not always be optimal because a greater number of variants need to be stored when it is used against data from ethnically distant individuals. Additionally, a reference sequence can be designed based on statistical properties or engineered to improve the compression ratio.

=== Encoding schemes ===
The application of different types of encoding schemes have been explored to encode variant bases and genomic coordinates. Fixed codes, such as the Golomb code and the Rice code, are suitable when the variant or coordinate (represented as integer) distribution is well defined. Variable codes, such as the Huffman code, provide a more general entropy encoding scheme when the underlying variant and/or coordinate distribution is not well-defined (this is typically the case in genomic sequence data).

== List of genomic re-sequencing data compression tools ==
The compression ratio of currently available genomic data compression tools ranges between 65-fold and 1,200-fold for human genomes. Very close variants or revisions of the same genome can be compressed very efficiently (for example, 18,133 compression ratio was reported for two revisions of the same A. thaliana genome, which are 99.999% identical). However, such compression is not indicative of the typical compression ratio for different genomes (individuals) of the same organism. The most common encoding scheme amongst these tools is Huffman coding, which is used for lossless data compression.

Genomic Sequencing data compression tools compatible with standard genome sequencing files formats (BAM & FASTQ)
Software	Description	Compression Ratio	Data Used for Evaluation	Approach/Encoding Scheme	Link	Use Licence	Reference
PetaSuite	Lossless compression tool for BAM and FASTQ.gz files; transparent on-the-fly readback through BAM and FASTQ.gz virtual files	60% to 90%	Human genome sequences from the 1000 Genomes Project		https://petagene.com	Commercial	
Genozip	A universal compressor for genomic files – compresses FASTQ, SAM/BAM/CRAM, VCF/BCF, FASTA, GFF/GTF/GVF, PHYLIP, BED and 23andMe files		Human genome sequences from the 1000 Genomes Project	Genozip extensible framework	http://genozip.com	Commercial, but free for non-commercial use	
Genomic Squeeze (G-SQZ)	Lossless compression tool designed for storing and analyzing sequencing read data	65% to 76%	Human genome sequences from the 1000 Genomes Project	Huffman coding	http://public.tgen.org/sqz	-Undeclared-	
CRAM (part of SAMtools)	Highly efficient and tunable reference-based compression of sequence data		European Nucleotide Archive	deflate and rANS	http://www.ebi.ac.uk/ena/software/cram-toolkit	Apache-2.0	
Genome Compressor (GeCo)	A tool using a mixture of multiple Markov models for compressing reference and reference-free sequences		Human nuclear genome sequence	Arithmetic coding	http://bioinformatics.ua.pt/software/geco/ or https://pratas.github.io/geco/	GPLv3	
GenomSys codecs	Lossless compression of BAM and FASTQ files into the standard format ISO/IEC 23092 (MPEG-G)	60% to 90%	Human genome sequences from the 1000 Genomes Project	Context-adaptive binary arithmetic coding (CABAC)	https://www.genomsys.com	Commercial	
fastafs	Compression of FASTA / UCSC2Bit files into random access compressed archives. Toolkit to mount FASTA files, indices and dictionary files virtually. This allows neat file system (api-like) integration without the need to fully decompress archives for random / partial access.		FASTA files	Huffman coding as implemented by Zstd	https://github.com/yhoogstrate/fastafs	GPL-v2.0	

Genomic Sequencing data compression tools not compatible with standard genome sequencing files formats
Software	Description	Compression Ratio	Data Used for Evaluation	Approach/Encoding Scheme	Link	Use License	Reference
Genome Differential Compressor (GDC)	LZ77-style tool for compressing multiple genomes of the same species	180 to 250-fold / 70 to 100-fold	Nuclear genome sequence of human and Saccharomyces cerevisiae	Huffman coding	http://sun.aei.polsl.pl/gdc	GPLv2	
Genome Re-Sequencing (GRS)	Reference sequence-based tool independent of a reference SNP map or sequence variation information	159-fold / 18,133-fold / 82-fold	Nuclear genome sequence of human, Arabidopsis thaliana (different revisions of the same genome), and Oryza sativa	Huffman coding	https://web.archive.org/web/20121209070434/http://gmdd.shgmo.org/Computational-Biology/GRS/	free of charge for non-commercial use	
Genome Re-sequencing Encoding (GReEN)	Probabilistic copy model-based tool for compressing re-sequencing data using a reference sequence	~100-fold	Human nuclear genome sequence	Arithmetic coding	http://bioinformatics.ua.pt/software/green/	-Undeclared-	
DNAzip	A package of compression tools	~750-fold	Human nuclear genome sequence	Huffman coding	http://www.ics.uci.edu/~dnazip/	-Undeclared-	
GenomeZip	Compression with respect to a reference genome. Optionally uses external databases of genomic variations (e.g. dbSNP)	~1200-fold	Human nuclear genome sequence (Watson) and sequences from the 1000 Genomes Project	Entropy coding for approximations of empirical distributions	https://sourceforge.net/projects/genomezip/	-Undeclared-	
