= SAM (file format) =

File format for gene sequences

SAM file format
- Filename extension: .sam
- Developed by: Heng Li; Bob Handsaker; Alec Wysoker; Tim Fennell; Jue Ruan; Nils Homer; Gabor Marth; Gonçalo Abecasis; Richard M. Durbin; 1000 Genomes Project
- Type of format: Bioinformatics
- Extended from: Tab-separated values
- Website: samtools.github.io/hts-specs/

Sequence Alignment Map (SAM) is a text-based format originally for storing biological sequences aligned to a reference sequence developed by Heng Li and Bob Handsaker et al. It was developed when the 1000 Genomes Project wanted to move away from the MAQ mapper format and decided to design a new format. The overall TAB-delimited flavour of the format came from an earlier format inspired by BLAT’s PSL. The name of SAM came from Gabor Marth from University of Utah, who originally had a format under the same name but with a different syntax more similar to a BLAST output. It is widely used for storing data, such as nucleotide sequences, generated by next generation sequencing technologies, and the standard has been broadened to include unmapped sequences. The format supports short and long reads (up to 128 Mbp) produced by different sequencing platforms and is used to hold mapped data within the Genome Analysis Toolkit (GATK) and across the Broad Institute, the Wellcome Sanger Institute, and throughout the 1000 Genomes Project.

== Format ==
The SAM format consists of a header and an alignment section. The binary equivalent of a SAM file is a Binary Alignment Map (BAM) file, which stores the same data in a compressed binary representation. SAM files can be analysed and edited with the software SAMtools. The header section, if present, must precede the alignment section. Headings begin with the '@' symbol, which distinguishes them from the alignment section. Alignment sections have 11 mandatory fields, as well as a variable number of optional fields.

Col	Field	Type	Brief description
1	QNAME	String	Query template NAME
2	FLAG	Int	bitwise FLAG
3	RNAME	String	References sequence NAME
4	POS	Int	1- based leftmost mapping POSition
5	MAPQ	Int	MAPping Quality
6	CIGAR	String	CIGAR string
7	RNEXT	String	Ref. name of the mate/next read
8	PNEXT	Int	Position of the mate/next read
9	TLEN	Int	observed Template LENgth
10	SEQ	String	segment SEQuence
11	QUAL	String	ASCII of Phred-scaled base QUALity+33

== Description ==
From the specification:

1. QNAME: Query template NAME. Reads/segments having identical QNAME are regarded to come from the same template. A QNAME ‘*’ indicates the information is unavailable. In a SAM file, a read may occupy multiple alignment lines, when its alignment is chimeric or when multiple mappings are given.
2. FLAG: Combination of bitwise FLAGs
3. RNAME: Reference sequence NAME of the alignment. If @SQ header lines are present, RNAME (if not ‘*’) must be present in one of the SQ-SN tag. An unmapped segment without coordinate has a ‘*’ at this field. However, an unmapped segment may also have an ordinary coordinate such that it can be placed at a desired position after sorting. If RNAME is ‘*’, no assumptions can be made about POS and CIGAR.
4. POS: 1-based leftmost mapping POSition of the first matching base. The first base in a reference sequence has coordinate 1. POS is set as 0 for an unmapped read without coordinate. If POS is 0, no assumptions can be made about RNAME and CIGAR.
5. MAPQ: MAPping Quality. It equals −10 log10 Pr{mapping position is wrong}, rounded to the nearest integer. A value 255 indicates that the mapping quality is not available.
6. CIGAR: Concise Idiosyncratic Gapped Alignment Report (CIGAR) string.
7. RNEXT: Reference sequence name of the primary alignment of the NEXT read in the template. For the last read, the next read is the first read in the template. If @SQ header lines are present, RNEXT (if not ‘*’ or ‘=’) must be present in one of the SQ-SN tag. This field is set as ‘*’ when the information is unavailable, and set as ‘=’ if RNEXT is identical RNAME. If not ‘=’ and the next read in the template has one primary mapping (see also bit 0x100 in FLAG), this field is identical to RNAME at the primary line of the next read. If RNEXT is ‘*’, no assumptions can be made on PNEXT and bit 0x20.
8. PNEXT: Position of the primary alignment of the NEXT read in the template. Set as 0 when the information is unavailable. This field equals POS at the primary line of the next read. If PNEXT is 0, no assumptions can be made on RNEXT and bit 0x20.
9. TLEN: signed observed Template LENgth. If all segments are mapped to the same reference, the unsigned observed template length equals the number of bases from the leftmost mapped base to the rightmost mapped base. The leftmost segment has a plus sign and the rightmost has a minus sign. The sign of segments in the middle is undefined. It is set as 0 for single-segment template or when the information is unavailable.
10. SEQ: segment SEQuence. This field can be a ‘*’ when the sequence is not stored. If not a ‘*’, the length of the sequence must equal the sum of lengths of M/I/S/=/X operations in CIGAR. An ‘=’ denotes the base is identical to the reference base. No assumptions can be made on the letter cases.
11. QUAL: ASCII of base QUALity plus 33 (same as the quality string in the Sanger FASTQ format). A base quality is the phred-scaled base error probability which equals −10 log10 Pr{base is wrong}. This field can be a ‘*’ when quality is not stored. If not a ‘*’, SEQ must not be a ‘*’ and the length of the quality string ought to equal the length of SEQ.

== Bitwise flags ==
The FLAG field is displayed as a single integer, but is the sum of bitwise flags to denote multiple attributes of a read alignment. Each attribute denotes one bit in the binary representation of the integer.

Bitwise Flags
Integer	Binary	Description (Paired Read Interpretation)
1	000000000001	template having multiple templates in sequencing (read is paired)
2	000000000010	each segment properly aligned according to the aligner (read mapped in proper pair)
4	000000000100	segment unmapped (read1 unmapped)
8	000000001000	next segment in the template unmapped (read2 unmapped)
16	000000010000	SEQ being reverse complemented (read1 reverse complemented)
32	000000100000	SEQ of the next segment in the template being reverse complemented (read2 reverse complemented)
64	000001000000	the first segment in the template (is read1)
128	000010000000	the last segment in the template (is read2)
256	000100000000	not primary alignment
512	001000000000	alignment fails quality checks
1024	010000000000	PCR or optical duplicate
2048	100000000000	supplementary alignment (e.g. aligner specific, could be a portion of a split read or a tied region)

The FLAG attributes are summed to get the final value, e.g. a SAM row resulting from an Illumina paired-end FASTQ record having the FLAG value 2145 would indicate:

Flag Value	Meaning	Flag Sum
1	read is paired	1
32	read2 was reverse complemented	33
64	read1	97
2048	Supplementary alignment	2145

== Optional fields ==
From the specification for Sequence Alignment/Map Optional Fields Specification (SAMtags):

The type may be one of A (character), C (integer 0-255), f (real number), H (hexadecimal array), i (integer), or Z (string). It may be a single value or B (general array).

Tag	Type	Description
AM	i	The smallest template-independent mapping quality in the template
AS	i	Alignment score generated by aligner
BC	Z	Barcode sequence identifying the sample
BQ	Z	Offset to base alignment quality (BAQ)
BZ	Z	Phred quality of the unique molecular barcode bases in the OX tag
CB	Z	Cell identifier
CC	Z	Reference name of the next hit
CG	B,I	BAM only: CIGAR in BAM's binary encoding if (and only if) it consists of >65535 operators
CM	i	Edit distance between the color sequence and the color reference (see also NM)
CO	Z	Free-text comments
CP	i	Leftmost coordinate of the next hit
CQ	Z	Color read base qualities
CR	Z	Cellular barcode sequence bases (uncorrected)
CS	Z	Color read sequence
CT	Z	Complete read annotation tag, used for consensus annotation dummy features
CY	Z	Phred quality of the cellular barcode sequence in the CR tag
E2	Z	The 2nd most likely base calls
FI	i	The index of segment in the template
FS	Z	Segment suffix
FZ	B,S	Flow signal intensities
GC	?	Reserved for backwards compatibility reasons
GQ	?	Reserved for backwards compatibility reasons
GS	?	Reserved for backwards compatibility reasons
H0	i	Number of perfect hits
H1	i	Number of 1-difference hits (see also NM)
H2	i	Number of 2-difference hits
HI	i	Query hit index
IH	i	Query hit total count
LB	Z	Library
MC	Z	CIGAR string for mate/next segment
MD	Z	String for mismatching positions
MF	?	Reserved for backwards compatibility reasons
MI	Z	Molecular identifier; a string that uniquely identifies the molecule from which the record was derived
ML	B, C	Base modification probabilities
MM	Z	Base modifications / methylation
MQ	i	Mapping quality of the mate/next segment
NH	i	Number of reported alignments that contain the query in the current record
NM	i	Edit distance to the reference
OA	Z	Original alignment
OC	Z	Original CIGAR (deprecated; use OA instead)
OP	i	Original mapping position (deprecated; use OA instead)
OQ	Z	Original base quality
OX	Z	Original unique molecular barcode bases
PG	Z	Program
PQ	i	Phred likelihood of the template
PT	Z	Read annotations for parts of the padded read sequence
PU	Z	Platform unit
Q2	Z	Phred quality of the mate/next segment sequence in the R2 tag
QT	Z	Phred quality of the sample barcode sequence in the BC tag
QX	Z	Quality score of the unique molecular identifier in the RX tag
R2	Z	Sequence of the mate/next segment in the template
RG	Z	Read group
RT	?	Reserved for backwards compatibility reasons
RX	Z	Sequence bases of the (possibly corrected) unique molecular identifier
S2	?	Reserved for backwards compatibility reasons
SA	Z	Other canonical alignments in a chimeric alignment
SM	i	Template-independent mapping quality
SQ	?	Reserved for backwards compatibility reasons
TC	i	The number of segments in the template
U2	Z	Phred probability of the 2nd call being wrong conditional on the best being wrong
UQ	i	Phred likelihood of the segment, conditional on the mapping being correct
X?	?	Reserved for end users
Y?	?	Reserved for end users
Z?	?	Reserved for end users

== See also ==
- The FASTA format, used to represent genome sequences
- The FASTQ format, used to represent DNA sequencer reads along with quality scores
- The GVF format (Genome Variation Format), an extension based on the GFF3 format
