= Heng Li =

Bioinformatician

- Known for: Bioinformatics; Burrows–Wheeler transform Samtools; TreeFam
- Awards: Benjamin Franklin Award (Bioinformatics) (2012)
- Scientific career
- Institutions: Wellcome Trust Sanger Institute; Broad Institute; Beijing Genomics Institute
- Thesis: Constructing the TreeFam database (2006)
- Doctoral advisor: Wei-Mou Zheng
- Website: hlilab.github.io

Heng Li is a Chinese bioinformatics scientist. He is an associate professor at the department of Biomedical Informatics of Harvard Medical School and the department of Data Science of Dana-Farber Cancer Institute. He was previously a research scientist working at the Broad Institute in Cambridge, Massachusetts with David Reich and David Altshuler. Li's work has made several important contributions in the field of next generation sequencing.

== Education ==
Li majored in physics at Nanjing University from 1997 to 2001. He received his PhD from the Institute of Theoretical Physics at the Chinese Academy of Sciences in 2006. His thesis, titled "Constructing the TreeFam database", was supervised by Wei-Mou Zheng.

== Research ==
Li was involved in a number of projects while working at the Beijing Genomics Institute from 2002 to 2006. These included studying rice finishing, silkworm sequencing, and genetic variation in chickens.

From 2006 to 2009, Li worked on a postdoctoral research fellowship with Richard M. Durbin at the Wellcome Trust Sanger Institute. During this time, Li made several important contributions to the field of next generation sequencing (NGS) through the development of software such as the SAMtools NGS utilities, the Burrows–Wheeler aligner (BWA), MAQ, TreeSoft and TreeFam.

Li joined the Broad Institute in 2009, working in the core faculty lab of David Altshuler, which investigates the discovery and understanding of the genetic causes of disease.

As of October 2025, Li's papers on SAMtools and BWA (sequence alignment using the Burrows–Wheeler transform) have both been cited over 50,000 times.

== Awards ==
In 2012, Li won the Benjamin Franklin award in bioinformatics. Li became the fourth former member of Richard Durbin's lab to win the award, following Sean Eddy, Ewan Birney and Alex Bateman. Li has been an ISCB Fellow since 2023.

== Personal ==
Li lives in Boston with his wife, daughter, and two cats.
