= 1000 Genomes Project =

International research effort on genetic variation

The 1000 Genomes Project (1KGP), taken place from January 2008 to 2015, was an international research effort to establish the most detailed catalogue of human genetic variation at the time. Scientists planned to sequence the genomes of at least one thousand anonymous healthy participants from a number of different ethnic groups within the following three years, using advancements in newly developed technologies. In 2010, the project finished its pilot phase, which was described in detail in a publication in the journal Nature. In 2012, the sequencing of 1092 genomes was announced in a Nature publication. In 2015, two papers in Nature reported results and the completion of the project and opportunities for future research.

Many rare variations, restricted to closely related groups, were identified, and eight structural-variation classes were analyzed.

The project united multidisciplinary research teams from institutes around the world, including China, Italy, Japan, Kenya, Nigeria, Peru, the United Kingdom, and the United States contributing to the sequence dataset and to a refined human genome map freely accessible through public databases to the scientific community and the general public alike.

The International Genome Sample Resource was created to host and expand on the data set after the project's end.

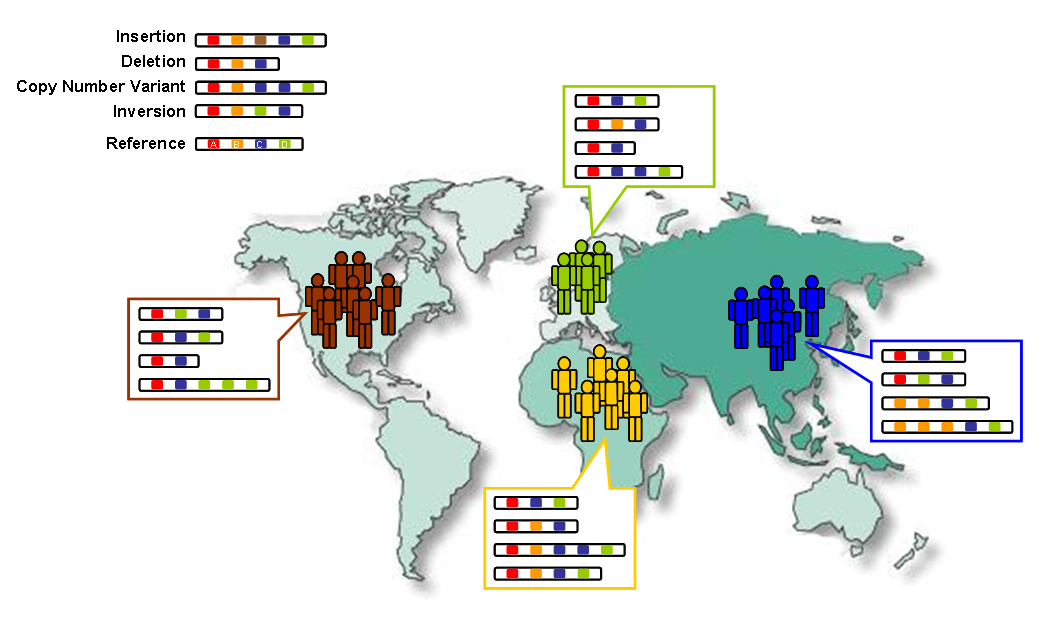
Changes in the number and order of genes (A-D) create genetic diversity within and between populations.

== Background ==
Since the completion of the Human Genome Project advances in human population genetics and comparative genomics enabled further insight into genetic diversity. The understanding about structural variations (insertions/deletions (indels), copy number variations (CNV), retroelements), single-nucleotide polymorphisms (SNPs), and natural selection were being solidified.

The diversity of Human genetic variation such as that Indels were being uncovered and investigating human genomic variations

=== Natural selection ===
It also aimed to provide evidence that can be used to explore the impact of natural selection on population differences. Patterns of DNA polymorphisms can be used to reliably detect signatures of selection and may help to identify genes that might underlie variation in disease resistance or drug metabolism. Such insights could improve understanding of phenotypic variations, genetic disorders and Mendelian inheritance and their effects on survival and/or reproduction of different human populations.

== Project description ==
=== Goals ===
The 1000 Genomes Project was designed to bridge the gap of knowledge between rare genetic variants that have a severe effect predominantly on simple traits (e.g. cystic fibrosis, Huntington disease) and common genetic variants have a mild effect and are implicated in complex traits (e.g. cognition, diabetes, heart disease).

The primary goal of this project was to create a complete and detailed catalogue of human genetic variations, which can be used for association studies relating genetic variation to disease. The consortium aimed to discover >95 % of the variants (e.g. SNPs, CNVs, indels) with minor allele frequencies as low as 1% across the genome and 0.1-0.5% in gene regions, as well as to estimate the population frequencies, haplotype backgrounds and linkage disequilibrium patterns of variant alleles.

Secondary goals included the support of better SNP and probe selection for genotyping platforms in future studies and the improvement of the human reference sequence. The completed database was expected be a useful tool for studying regions under selection, variation in multiple populations and understanding the underlying processes of mutation and recombination.

=== Outline ===
The human genome consists of approximately 3 billion DNA base pairs and is estimated to carry around 20,000 protein coding genes. In designing the study the consortium needed to address several critical issues regarding the project metrics such as technology challenges, data quality standards and sequence coverage.

Over the course of the next three years, scientists at the Sanger Institute, BGI Shenzhen and the National Human Genome Research Institute’s Large-Scale Sequencing Network planned to sequence a minimum of 1,000 human genomes. Due to the large amount of sequence data that was required, recruiting additional participants was maintained.

Almost 10 billion bases were to be sequenced per day over a period of the two year production phase, equating to more than two human genomes every 24 hours. The intended sequence dataset was to comprise 6 trillion DNA bases, 60-fold more sequence data than what has been published in DNA databases at the time.

To determine the final design of the full project three pilot studies were to be carried out within the first year of the project. The first pilot intends to genotype 180 people of 3 major geographic groups at low coverage (2×). For the second pilot study, the genomes of two nuclear families (both parents and an adult child) are going to be sequenced with deep coverage (20× per genome). The third pilot study involves sequencing the coding regions (exons) of 1,000 genes in 1,000 people with deep coverage (20×).

It was estimated that the project would likely cost more than $500 million if standard DNA sequencing technologies were used. Several newer technologies (e.g. Solexa, 454, SOLiD) were to be applied, lowering the expected costs to between $30 million and $50 million. The major support was provided by the Wellcome Trust Sanger Institute in Hinxton, England; the Beijing Genomics Institute, Shenzhen (BGI Shenzhen), China; and the NHGRI, part of the National Institutes of Health (NIH).

In keeping with Fort Lauderdale principles all genome sequence data (including variant calls) is freely available as the project progresses and can be downloaded via ftp from the 1000 genomes project webpage.

=== Human genome samples ===
Locations of population samples of 1000 Genomes Project. Each circle represents the number of sequences in the final release.

Based on the overall goals for the project, the samples will be chosen to provide power in populations where association studies for common diseases are being carried out. Furthermore, the samples do not need to have medical or phenotype information since the proposed catalogue will be a basic resource on human variation.

For the pilot studies human genome samples from the HapMap collection will be sequenced. It will be useful to focus on samples that have additional data available (such as ENCODE sequence, genome-wide genotypes, fosmid-end sequence, structural variation assays, and gene expression) to be able to compare the results with those from other projects.

Complying with extensive ethical procedures, the 1000 Genomes Project will then use samples from volunteer donors. The following populations will be included in the study: Yoruba in Ibadan (YRI), Nigeria; Japanese in Tokyo (JPT); Chinese in Beijing (CHB); Utah residents with ancestry from northern and western Europe (CEU); Luhya in Webuye, Kenya (LWK); Maasai in Kinyawa, Kenya (MKK); Toscani in Italy (TSI); Peruvians in Lima, Peru (PEL); Gujarati Indians in Houston (GIH); Chinese in metropolitan Denver (CHD); people of Mexican ancestry in Los Angeles (MXL); and people of African ancestry in the southwestern United States (ASW).

ID	Place	Population	Detail
ASW	(United States) *	African Ancestry in Southwestern US	
ACB	(Barbados) *	African Caribbean in Barbados	
BEB	(Bangladesh)	Bengali in Bangladesh	
GBR	(United Kingdom)	British from England and Scotland	
CDX	(China)	Chinese Dai in Xishuangbanna, China	
CLM	(Colombia)	Colombian in Medellín, Colombia	
ESN	(Nigeria)	Esan in Nigeria	
FIN	(Finland)	Finnish in Finland	
GWD	(The Gambia)	Gambian in Western Division – Mandinka	
GIH	(United States) *	Gujarati Indians in Houston, Texas, United States	
CHB	(China)	Han Chinese in Beijing, China	
CHS	(China)	Han Chinese South China	
IBS	(Spain)	Iberian populations in Spain	
ITU	(United Kingdom) *	Indian Telugu in the United Kingdom	
JPT	(Japan)	Japanese in Tokyo, Japan	
KHV	(Vietnam)	Kinh in Ho Chi Minh City, Vietnam	
LWK	(Kenya)	Luhya in Webuye, Kenya	
MSL	(Sierra Leone)	Mende in Sierra Leone	
MXL	(United States) *	Mexican Ancestry in Los Angeles, California, United States	
PEL	(Peru)	Peruvian in Lima, Peru	
PUR	(Puerto Rico)	Puerto Rican in Puerto Rico	
PJL	(Pakistan)	Punjabi in Lahore, Pakistan	
STU	(United Kingdom) *	Sri Lankan Tamil in the United Kingdom	
TSI	(Italy)	Toscani in Italy	
YRI	(Nigeria)	Yoruba in Ibadan, Nigeria	
CEU	(United States) *	Utah residents with Northern and Western European ancestry from the CEPH collection	

* Population that was collected in diaspora

=== Community meeting ===
Data generated by the 1000 Genomes Project is widely used by the genetics community, making the first 1000 Genomes Project one of the most cited papers in biology. To support this user community, the project held a community analysis meeting in July 2012 that included talks highlighting key project discoveries, their impact on population genetics and human disease studies, and summaries of other large-scale sequencing studies.

== Project findings ==
=== Pilot phase ===
The pilot phase consisted of three projects:

- low-coverage whole-genome sequencing of 179 individuals from 4 populations
- high-coverage sequencing of 2 trios (mother-father-child)
- exon-targeted sequencing of 697 individuals from 7 populations

It was found that on average, each person carries around 250–300 loss-of-function variants in annotated genes and 50-100 variants previously implicated in inherited disorders. Based on the two trios, it is estimated that the rate of de novo germline mutation is approximately 10^{−8} per base per generation.

== See also ==
- Human Genome Project
- HapMap Project
- Personal genomics
- Population groups in biomedicine
- 1000 Plant Genomes Project
- List of biological databases
