= Mark Daly (scientist) =

American geneticist

- Born: September 15, 1967 (age 58)
- Citizenship: American
- Education: Massachusetts Institute of Technology
- Known for: Genome-wide association study; International HapMap Project; 1000 Genomes Project
- Awards: Curt Stern Award
- Scientific career
- Workplaces: Broad Institute of MIT and Harvard; Massachusetts General Hospital; Harvard University; Institute for Molecular Medicine (FIMM) at the University of Helsinki
- Doctoral advisors: Eric Lander; Gert-Jan van Ommen

Mark Joseph Daly is Director of the Finnish Institute for Molecular Medicine (FIMM) at the University of Helsinki, a Professor of Genetics at Harvard Medical School, Chief of the Analytic and Translational Genetic Unit at Massachusetts General Hospital, and a member of the Broad Institute of MIT and Harvard. In the early days of the Human Genome Project, Daly helped develop the genetic model by which linkage disequilibrium could be used to map the haplotype structure of the human genome. In addition, he developed statistical methods to find associations between genes and disorders such as Crohn's disease, inflammatory bowel disease, autism and schizophrenia.

Daly is considered a pioneer in the field of human genetics, and is amongst the most cited scientists in the field, and one of the top 100 most cited scientists of all time. He was elected to the National Academy of Medicine in 2017.

== Education ==
Daly studied physics at MIT, although he initially wanted to become a lawyer or poker player, he joined Eric Lander as a freshman. Mark continued to work with Lander, before eventually receiving his PhD from Leiden University in 2004.

== Research ==
Daly trained with Eric Lander at the Whitehead Institute, and most of his initial efforts were to map haplotypes across the human genome. During his time there, his team developed MapMaker, GeneHunter, Haploview, PLINK, and GATK. Collectively these tools have received over 30,000 citations. As genome sequencing has become cheaper, his group works on developing statistical methods to implicate genetic mutations in neuropsychiatric diseases.

In 2019, Daly led a large-scale sequencing effort that identified rare mutations in several genes strongly associated with schizophrenia. At the time, this was the largest study of protein-coding genetic variation in schizophrenia. In 2026, Daly launched a Broad Institute initiative aimed at systematically translating genetic discoveries into disease mechanisms and therapeutic opportunities, while building a "growing, queryable knowledge base".
