= Haplotype estimation =

In genetics, haplotype estimation (also known as "phasing") refers to the process of statistical estimation of haplotypes from genotype data. The most common situation arises when genotypes are collected at a set of polymorphic sites from a group of individuals. For example in human genetics, genome-wide association studies collect genotypes in thousands of individuals at between 200,000-5,000,000 SNPs using microarrays. Haplotype estimation methods are used in the analysis of these datasets and allow genotype imputation of alleles from reference databases such as the HapMap Project and the 1000 Genomes Project.

== Genotypes and haplotypes ==
Genotypes measure the unordered combination of alleles at each locus, whereas haplotypes represent the genetic information on multiple loci that have been inherited together from an individual's parents. Theoretically the number of possible haplotypes equals to the product of allele numbers of each locus in consideration. Specially, most of the SNPs are bi-allelic; Therefore when considering $N$ heterozygous bi-allelic loci, there will be $2^{N}$ possible pairs of haplotypes that could underlie the genotypes. For example, when considering two bi-allelic loci A and B ($N=2$), of which the genotypes are a_{1} and a_{2}, b_{1} and b_{2}, respectively, we will have the following haplotypes: a_{1}_b_{1}, a_{1}_b_{2}, a_{2}_b_{1}, and a_{2}_b_{2} ("_" indicates that the alleles are on the same chromosome).

== Haplotype estimation methods ==
Many statistical methods have been proposed for estimation of haplotypes. Some of the earliest approaches used a simple multinomial model in which each possible haplotype consistent with the sample was given an unknown frequency parameter and these parameters were estimated with an Expectation–maximization algorithm. These approaches were only able to handle small numbers of sites at once, although sequential versions were later developed, specifically the SNPHAP method.

The most accurate and widely used methods for haplotype estimation utilize some form of hidden Markov model (HMM) to carry out inference. For a long time PHASE was the most accurate method. PHASE was the first method to utilize ideas from coalescent theory concerning the joint distribution of haplotypes. This method used a Gibbs sampling approach in which each individuals haplotypes were updated conditional upon the current estimates of haplotypes from all other samples. Approximations to the distribution of a haplotype conditional upon a set of other haplotypes were used for the conditional distributions of the Gibbs sampler. PHASE was used to estimate the haplotypes from the HapMap Project. PHASE was limited by its speed and was not applicable to datasets from genome-wide association studies.

The fastPHASE and BEAGLE methods introduced haplotype cluster models applicable to GWAS-sized datasets. Subsequently the IMPUTE2 and MaCH methods were introduced that were similar to the PHASE approach but much faster. These methods iteratively update the haplotype estimates of each sample conditional upon a subset of K haplotype estimates of other samples. IMPUTE2 introduced the idea of carefully choosing which subset of haplotypes to condition on to improve accuracy. Accuracy increases with K but with quadratic $O(K^2)$ computational complexity.

The SHAPEIT1 method made a major advance by introducing a linear $O(K)$ complexity method that operates only on the space of haplotypes consistent with an individual's genotypes. The HAPI-UR method subsequently proposed a very similar method. SHAPEIT2 combines the best features of SHAPEIT1 and IMPUTE2 to improve efficiency and accuracy.

== See also ==
- List of haplotype estimation and genotype imputation software
- imputation: predict missing genotypes using known haplotypes
