= Microfluidic whole genome haplotyping =

Microfluidic whole genome haplotyping is a technique for the physical separation of individual chromosomes from a metaphase cell followed by direct resolution of the haplotype for each allele.

== Background ==
=== Whole genome haplotyping ===
Whole genome haplotyping is the process of resolving personal haplotypes on a whole genome basis. Current methods of next generation sequencing are capable of identifying heterozygous loci, but they are not well suited to identify which polymorphisms exist on the same (in cis) or allelic (in trans) strand of DNA. Haplotype information contributes to the understanding of the potential functional effects of variants in cis or in trans. Haplotypes are more frequently resolved by inference through comparison with parental genotypes, or from population samples using statistical computational methods to determine linkage disequilibrium between markers. Direct haplotyping is possible through isolation of chromosomes or chromosome segments. Most molecular biology techniques for haplotyping can accurately determine haplotypes of only a limited region of the genome. Whole genome direct haplotyping involves the resolution of haplotype at the whole genome level, usually through the isolation of individual chromosomes.

==== Haplotype ====
A haplotype (haplo: from Ancient Greek ἁπλόος (haplóos, “single, simple”) is a contiguous section of closely linked segments of DNA within the larger genome that tend to be inherited together as a unit on a single chromosome. Haplotypes have no defined size and can refer to anything from a few closely linked loci up to an entire chromosome. The term is also used to describe groups of single-nucleotide polymorphisms (SNPs) that are statistically associated. Most of the knowledge of SNP association comes from the effort of the International HapMap Project, which has proved itself a powerful resource in the development of a publicly accessible database of human genetic variation.

==== Phasing ====
Phasing is the process of identifying the individual complement of homologous chromosomes. Methods for phasing include pedigree analysis, allele-specific PCR, linkage emulsion PCR haplotype analysis, polony PCR, sperm typing, bacterial artificial chromosome cloning, construction of somatic cell hybrids, atomic force microscopy, among others. Haplotype phasing can also be achieved through computational inference methods.

=== Microfluidics ===
Microfluidics refers to the use of micro-sized channels on a micro-electro-mechanical system (MEMS). Microfluidic channels have a diameter of 10-100μm, making it possible to manipulate and analyze minute volumes. This technology combines engineering, physics, chemistry, biology, and optics. Over the past decades it has revolutionized micro and nanoscale biology, genetics and proteomics. Microfluidic devices can combine several analytical steps into one device. This technology has been coined by some as the "lab on a chip" technology. Most current molecular biology methods use some form of MEMS, including microarray technology and next generation sequencing instruments.

== Microfluidic direct deterministic phasing ==
=== Principle ===
Direct deterministic phasing of individual chromosomes can be achieved by isolating single chromosomes for genetic analysis through the use of a microfluidic device.

=== Methods ===
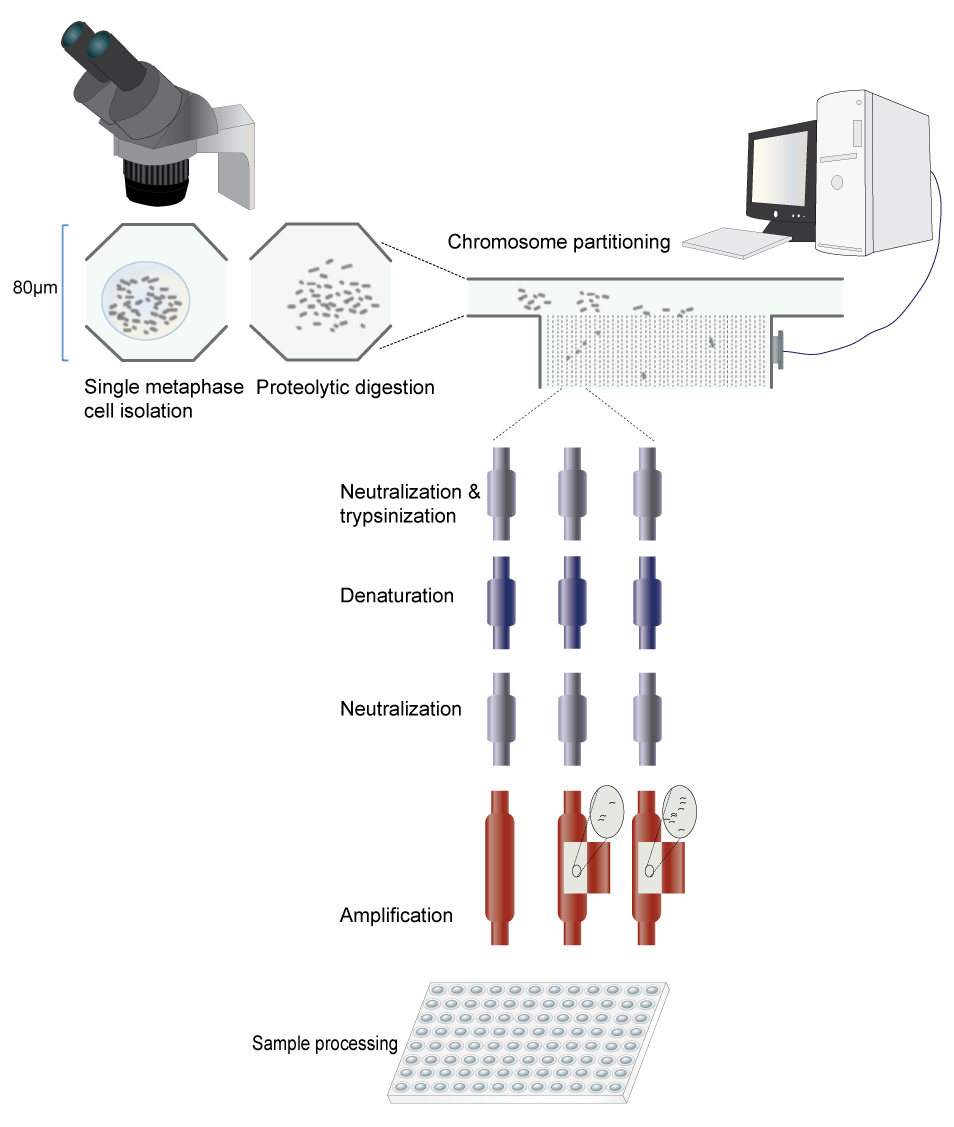
Workflow of microfluidic whole genome chromosome isolation and amplification. Not at scale

A single metaphase cell is isolated from solution. The chromosomes are then released from the nucleus, and the cytoplasm is digested enzymatically. Next, the chromosome suspension is directed towards multiple partitioning channels. The chromosomes are physically directed into the partitioning channels using a series of valves. In the first description of this technique, Fan et al. designed a custom-made program (MatLab) to control this process. Once separated, the chromosomes are prepared for amplification by sequential addition and washout of trypsin, denaturation buffer and neutralization solution. The DNA is then ready for further processing. Because of the small amount of DNA, amplification needs to be performed using kits specialized for very small initial DNA quantities. The amplified DNA is flushed out of the microfluidic device and solubilized by the addition of a buffer. The amplified DNA can now be analyzed by various methods.

Once the chromosomes have been isolated and amplified any molecular haplotyping can be applied as long as the chromosomes remain distinct. This could be accomplished by keeping them physically separated, or identifying each sample by genotyping. Once each chromosome has been identified each pair of homologs can be assorted into one of two haploid genomes.

=== Applications ===
Microfluidic direct deterministic phasing allows all the chromosomes to be isolated in the same experiment. This unique feature suggests possible applications within clinical, research and personal genomics realms. Some of the possible clinical applications for this technique include phasing of multiple mutations when parental samples are unavailable, preimplantation genetic diagnosis, prenatal diagnosis and in the characterization of cancer cells.

Whole genome haplotyping through microfluidics will increase the rate of discovery within the HapMap project, and provides an opportunity for corroboration and error detection within the existing database. It will further inform genetic association studies.

As methods for amplification of small amounts of DNA improve, single chromosome sequencing is possible using microfluidics to separate each individual chromosome. A cost-effective approach may be to barcode each individual chromosome and perform parallel resequencing of the entire individual genome. The amplification of each chromosome separately also provides a mechanism to potentially fill in some of the gaps that remain in the human reference genome. Single chromosome sequencing will allow for unmapped sequences to be associated with a single chromosome. Additionally, single chromosome sequencing will be more accurate in the identification of copy number variants and repetitive sequences.

=== Limitations ===
As of January 2011, only one publication has described use of this technique. The scientific commons awaits further validation of this method and its efficacy in isolating and amplifying analyzable amounts of DNA. While this method does streamline the process of chromosome isolation, certain parts in the process – such as the initial isolation of a metaphase cell – remain difficult and labour intensive. Other automated techniques for metaphase cell separation would improve throughput. In addition, this method is only applicable to cells in metaphase, which inherently limits the technique to cell types and tissues that undergo mitosis. Single cell analysis does not account for the possibility of mosaicism; therefore, applications in cancer diagnosis and research would necessarily require processing of multiple cells. Finally, since this entire process is based on amplification from a single cell, the accuracy of any genetic analysis is limited to the ability of commercially available platforms to produce sufficient amounts of unbiased and error free amplicon.

== Alternative methods of whole genome haplotyping ==
=== Chromosome microdissection ===
Chromosome microdissection is another process for isolating single chromosomes for genetic analysis. As with the above technique microdissection begins with metaphase cells. The nucleus is lysed mechanically on a glass slide and part of the genetic material is partitioned under microscope. The actual microdissection of genetic material was initially accomplished through the careful use of a fine needle. Today computer-directed lasers are available. The genomic area isolated can range from part of a single chromosome, up to several chromosomes. To accomplish whole genome haplotyping the microdissected genomic section is amplified and genotyped or sequenced. Like with the microfluidic technique, specialized amplification platforms are necessary to address the problem of a small initial DNA sample.

=== Large insert cloning ===
Randomly partitioning a complete diploid fosmid library into various pools of equal size presents an alternative method for haplotype phasing. In the proof of principle description of this technique 115 pools were created containing ~5000 unique clones from the original fosmid library. Each of these pools contained roughly 3% of the genome. Between the 3% in each pool and the fact that each clone is a random sampling of the diploid genome, 99.1% of the time each pool contains DNA from a single homolog. Amplification and analysis of each pool provide haplotype resolution limited only by the size of the fosmid insert.
