= List of haplotype estimation and genotype imputation software =

This is a list of notable software for haplotype estimation and genotype imputation.

Alphabetical order:

- AlphaImpute
- Beagle
- cnF2freq
- DAGPHASE
- Eagle
- fastPHASE
- FILLIN (part of TASSEL)
- FImpute
- findhap
- FSFHap (part of TASSEL)
- HAPI-UR
- IMPUTE2
- LDMIP
- LinkImpute
- LinkImputeR
- MACH
- PHASE
- PlantImpute
- SHAPEIT2
- SHAPEIT3
- SHAPEIT4
- SimWalk2
- SNPHAP
- STITCH
- WhatsHap
- HapCUT2
- Hap10
- H-PoP
