= GPR26 =

Protein-coding gene in humans

Identifiers
- Aliases: GPR26, G protein-coupled receptor 26
- External IDs: OMIM: 604847; MGI: 2441758; GeneCards: GPR26

Gene location (Human)
| Chr. | Chromosome 10 (human) |
| Band | 10q26.13 | Start | 123,666,355 bp |
| Band | 10q26.13 | End | 123,697,399 bp |

Gene location (Mouse)
| Chr. | Chromosome 7 (mouse) |
| Band | 7|7 F3 | Start | 131,568,189 bp |
| Band | 7|7 F3 | End | 131,596,134 bp |
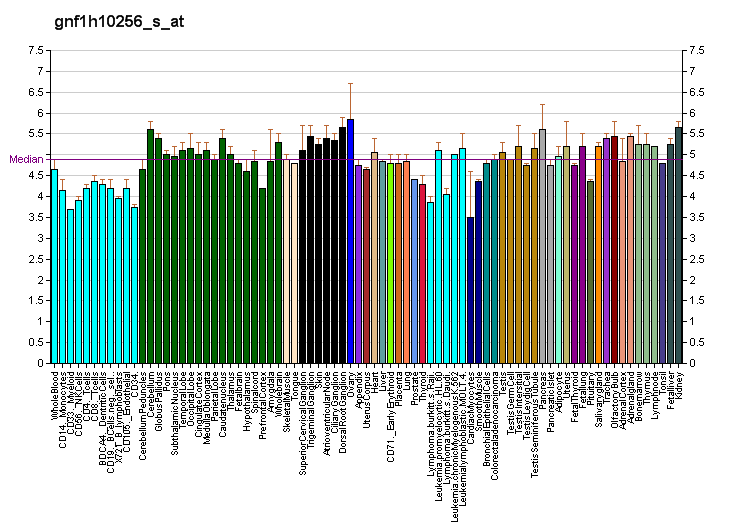

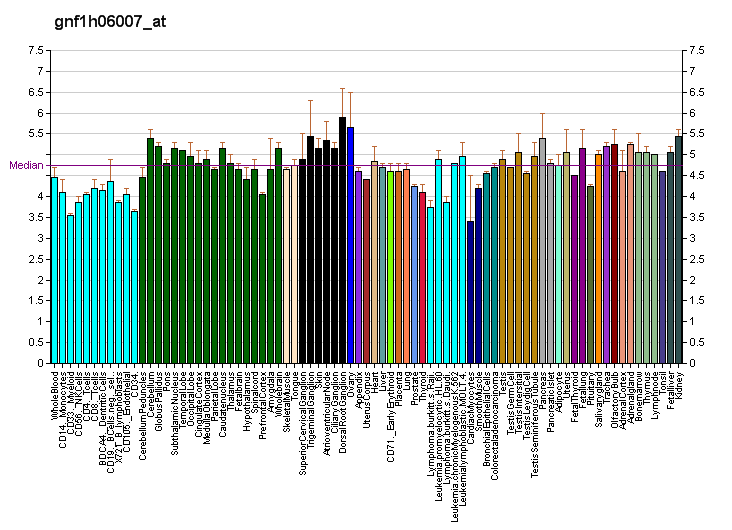
RNA expression pattern
| Bgee | Human / Mouse (ortholog); Top expressed in: endothelial cell; Brodmann area 23; pars compacta; pars reticulata; tendon of biceps brachii; middle temporal gyrus; Brodmann area 46; buccal mucosa cell; myocardium; myocardium of left ventricle / Top expressed in: superior frontal gyrus; primary visual cortex; lumbar subsegment of spinal cord; dentate gyrus of hippocampal formation granule cell; islands of Calleja; amygdalohippocampal area; medial septal nucleus; dorsal cochlear nucleus; cortical amygdaloid nucleus; paraventricular nucleus of thalamus; More reference expression data |
| BioGPS | More reference expression data |
Gene ontology
| Molecular function | signal transducer activity; G protein-coupled receptor activity |
| Cellular component | plasma membrane; membrane; integral component of membrane; intracellular anatomical structure |
| Biological process | adenylate cyclase-activating G protein-coupled receptor signaling pathway; G protein-coupled receptor signaling pathway; signal transduction |
Sources:Amigo / QuickGO
Orthologs
| Databases | NCBI: entry; OMA: entry |
| Species | Human | Mouse |
| Entrez | 2849 | 233919 |
| Ensembl | ENSG00000154478 | ENSMUSG00000040125 |
| UniProt | Q8NDV2 | Q8BZA7 |
| RefSeq (mRNA) | NM_153442 | NM_173410 |
| RefSeq (protein) | NP_703143 | NP_775586 |
| Location (UCSC) | Chr 10: 123.67 – 123.7 Mb | Chr 7: 131.57 – 131.6 Mb |
| PubMed search |
- Wikidata
| View/Edit Human | View/Edit Mouse |

G-protein coupled receptor 26 is a protein that in humans is encoded by the GPR26 gene. GPR26 expression is found to peak perinatally, when the visual system is first challenged, and contains a 53 kb LD-block enriched for association with introgressed Neanderthal-derived SNPs. Additionally, it is known to form oligomeric structures with the 5-HT1a receptor.
