= Haplotype block =

Genomic region containing only a few distinct haplotypes

In genetics, a haplotype block is a region of an organism's genome in which there is little evidence of a history of genetic recombination, and which contain only a small number of distinct haplotypes. According to the haplotype-block model, such blocks should show high levels of linkage disequilibrium and be separated from one another by numerous recombination events. The boundaries of haplotype blocks cannot be directly observed; they must instead be inferred indirectly through the use of algorithms. However, some evidence suggests that different algorithms for identifying haplotype blocks give very different results when used on the same data, though another study suggests that their results are generally consistent. The National Institutes of Health funded the HapMap project to catalog haplotype blocks throughout the human genome.

== Definition ==
There are two main ways that the term "haplotype block" is defined: one based on whether a given genomic sequence displays higher linkage disequilibrium than a predetermined threshold, and one based on whether the sequence consists of a minimum number of single nucleotide polymorphisms (SNPs) that explain a majority of the common haplotypes in the sequence (or a lower-than-usual number of unique haplotypes). In 2001, Patil et al. proposed the following definition of the term: "Suppose we have a number of haplotypes consisting of a set of consecutive SNPs. A segment of consecutive SNPs is a block if at least α percent of haplotypes are represented more than once".
