= Kelly A. Frazer =

American physician

Kelly A Frazer
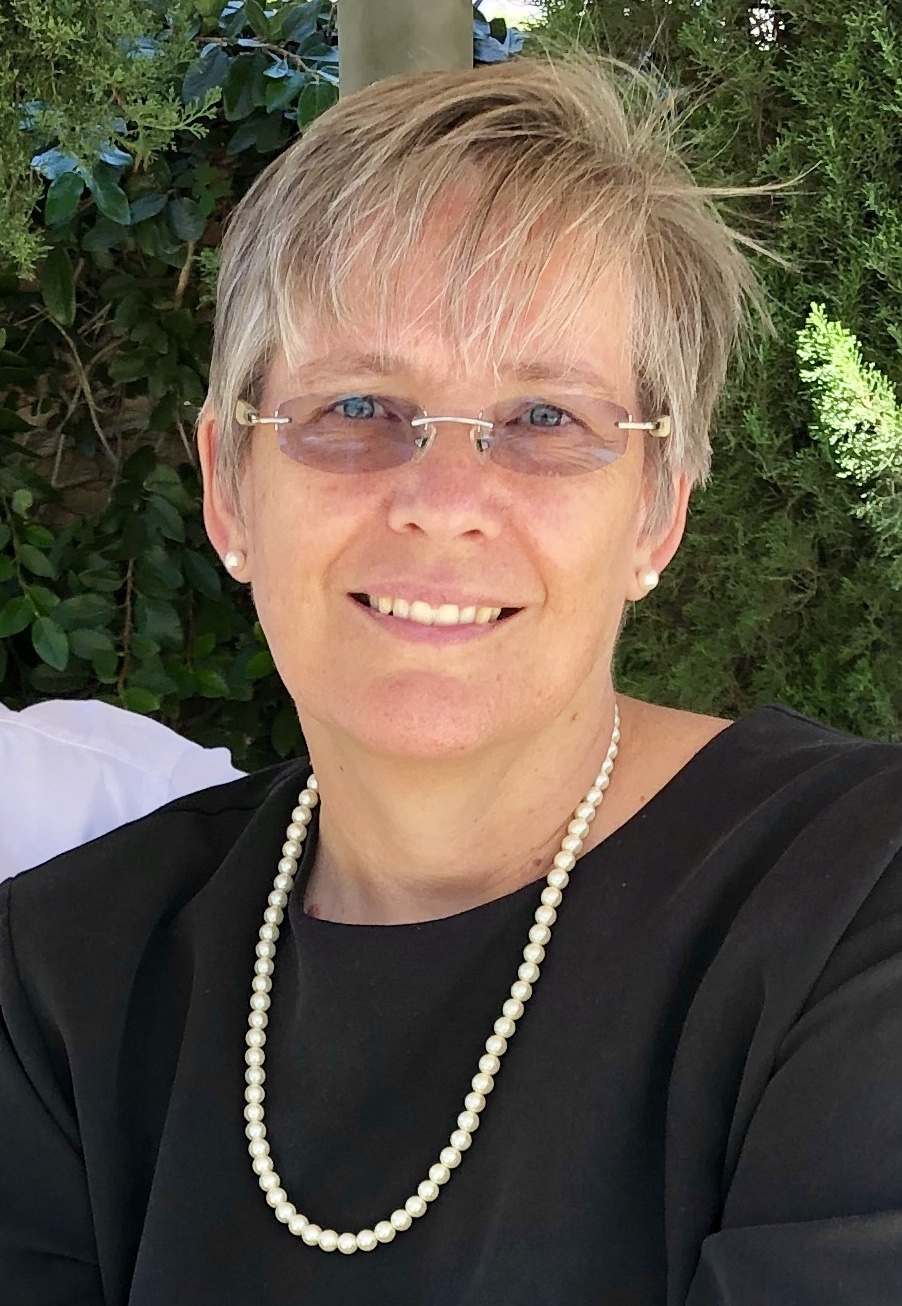
- Education: University of California, San Francisco
- Known for: Human Genomics; International HapMap Project; Functional characterization of non-coding regulatory variants
- Scientific career
- Workplaces: University of California, San Diego
- Doctoral advisor: David R. Cox
- Other academic advisors: Edward Rubin

Kelly A Frazer is a Professor of Pediatrics in the Medical School at the University of California, San Diego, Chief of the Division of Genome Information Sciences and Director of the Institute for Genomic Medicine.

== Education ==
Frazer did her undergraduate studies at the University of California, Santa Cruz. She then attended the UCSF Medical Center at the University of California, San Francisco and received her PhD in 1993.

== Research ==
Over the past thirty-three years Frazer has researched and discovered insights into the molecular underpinnings of a wide variety of human diseases and complex traits. As a postdoctoral fellow she and Edward Rubin pioneered cross-species DNA sequence comparisons between humans and mice resulting in the discovery of evolutionarily conserved non-coding regulatory sequences in the human genome. As Vice President of Genome Biology at Perlegen Sciences Frazer worked with David Cox and others to generate the content for the HapMap Phase II project and determined that common structural variants are largely in linkage disequilibrium with common SNPs. She joined UC San Diego as a faculty member in August 2009 and has developed novel methods for identifying and functionally characterizing regulatory variants underlying GWAS signals and has contributed to a greater understanding of mutational signatures in cancer.
