= Finnish Realm Union =

Organization operating in Finland during the Continuation War

The Finnish Realm Union (Suomen Valtakunnan Liitto, SVL) was an organization operating in Finland during the Continuation War, whose task was to bring together pro-Nazi forces under the same umbrella organization and at the same time bring them closer together. SVL's ultimate goal after the victory in the war was to form a one-party system in Finland like in Germany.

It has been alleged that the SVL was prepared by the Nazi Germany to perform a National Socialist coup against the Finnish government in the case Finland seeks a separate peace with the Soviet Union. The SVL was led by Mauno Vannas, professor of Ophthalmology and Rolf Nevanlinna, mathematics professor and developer of Nevanlinna theory and its program had been personally approved by Himmler and Alfred Rosenberg. According to authors Juha Pohjonen and Oula Silvennoinen, the Finnish war hero Captain Lauri Törni was also part of this operation.

The Finnish Realm Union included strikingly many representatives of art, culture and science; the best-known were the sculptor Wäinö Aaltonen, the geologist Väinö Auer, the composer Yrjö Kilpinen, the linguist J. J. Mikkola and the film director Risto Orko. Over 30 professors were also members. Allegedly the membership of the SVL was as high as 6000. The SVL was funded by among others the industrialist Antti Wihuri of shipowner Wihuri ltd and Jenny and Antti Wihuri Foundation.
