= Uncharacterized protein C15orf32 =

Protein-coding gene in the species Homo sapiens

C15orf32

Identifiers
- Aliases: C15orf32, chromosome 15 open reading frame 32, chromosome 15 putative open reading frame 32
- External IDs: GeneCards: C15orf32

Gene location (Human)
Chr.	Chromosome 15 (human)
Band	15q26.1	Start	92,471,654 bp
Band	15q26.1	End	92,501,117 bp
RNA expression pattern
Bgee	Human / Mouse (ortholog); Top expressed in: ventricular zone; gonad; ganglionic eminence; islet of Langerhans; gastrocnemius muscle; monocyte; left testis; tibial arteries; right testis; upper lobe of left lung / n/a; More reference expression data
BioGPS	n/a
Orthologs
Databases	NCBI: entry; OMA: entry
Species	Human	Mouse
Entrez	145858	n/a
Ensembl	ENSG00000183643	n/a
UniProt	Q32M92	n/a
RefSeq (mRNA)	NM_001301106; NM_153040	n/a
RefSeq (protein)	NP_001288035; NP_694585	n/a
Location (UCSC)	Chr 15: 92.47 – 92.5 Mb	n/a
PubMed search		n/a
- Wikidata
View/Edit Human

Uncharacterized Protein C15orf32 is a protein which in humans is encoded by the C15orf32 gene and is located on chromosome 15, location 15q26.1. Variants of C15orf32 have been linked to bipolar disorder, alcohol use disorder, and acute myeloid leukemia.

Location of C15orf32 on chromosome 15

== Gene ==
C15orf32, which stands for chromosome 15 open reading frame 32, is a gene on the plus strand of chromosome 15, on the cytogenetic band 15q26.1. C15orf32 is 29,464 bases long; on Genome Reference Consortium Human Build 38, it spans bases 92,471,654-92,501,117. It contains 3 exons.

== Transcripts ==
Two isoforms of C15orf32 exist. The longer transcript, known as transcript variant 2 on NCBI, is 1,764 bases long. The other is transcript 1 and is 1,726 bases long.

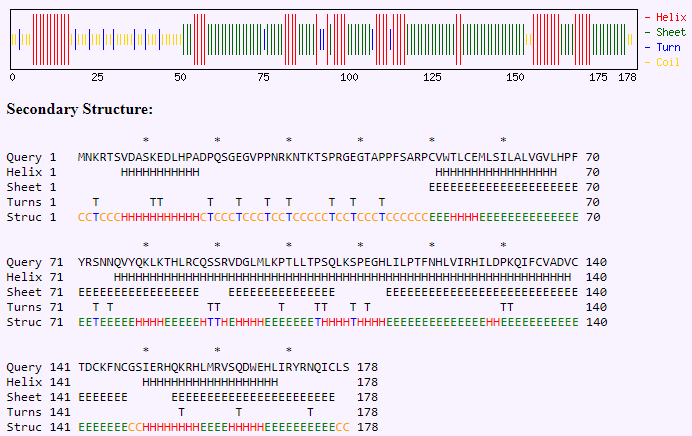
Chou–Fasman secondary structure prediction for C15orf32

== Proteins ==
The transcript variant 2 of the C15orf32 gene encodes a 178 amino acid protein and has a molecular mass of 20,262 Da. Its basal isoelectric point is 9.34. Transcript variant 1 is missing amino acids 166–178. There is significantly large spacing between the glutamic acid residues at locations 12 and 23.

=== Structure ===
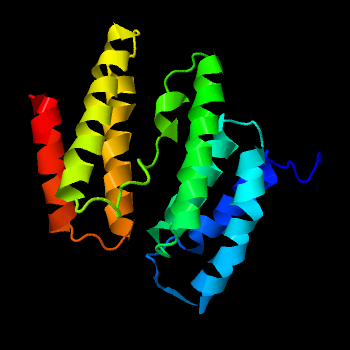
Tertiary structure predicted by I-TASSER for C15orf32 with highest confidence

A transmembrane segment is predicted between amino acids 51 and 71 by Phobius and amino acids 57 and 71 by SAPS. The N-terminus is predicted to be outside of the cytoplasm, and the C-terminus within the cytoplasm. The Chou–Fasman algorithm predicts a beta sheet in this region, as well as much of region between amino acids 114 and 147. I-TASSER was used to predict the tertiary structure. The top model predicted eight alpha helices, including one between amino acids 51 and 71 concurrent with the transmembrane segment predicted earlier, although this structure had low confidence.

== Regulation ==
=== Gene level ===
The promoter region of C15orf32 is predicted to span base pairs 92,470,677-92,471,777 according to Gene2Promoter tool by Genomatix. The most commonly predicted transcription factor families by the MatInspector tool from Genomatix within this promoter region were SOX, nuclear receptor subfamily 2, and retinoid X receptor. Transcription factor binding sites that have been determined experimentally include STAT1, MAFK, and JUND and are located within the second intron. C15orf32 is expressed most notably in testes, brain, heart, and early in the development of fetuses, although expression is very low. Exposure to some compounds such as bromelain, Bortezomib, estrogen, and 4-hydroxytamoxifen lead to increase in C15orf32 expression in breast cancer cells.

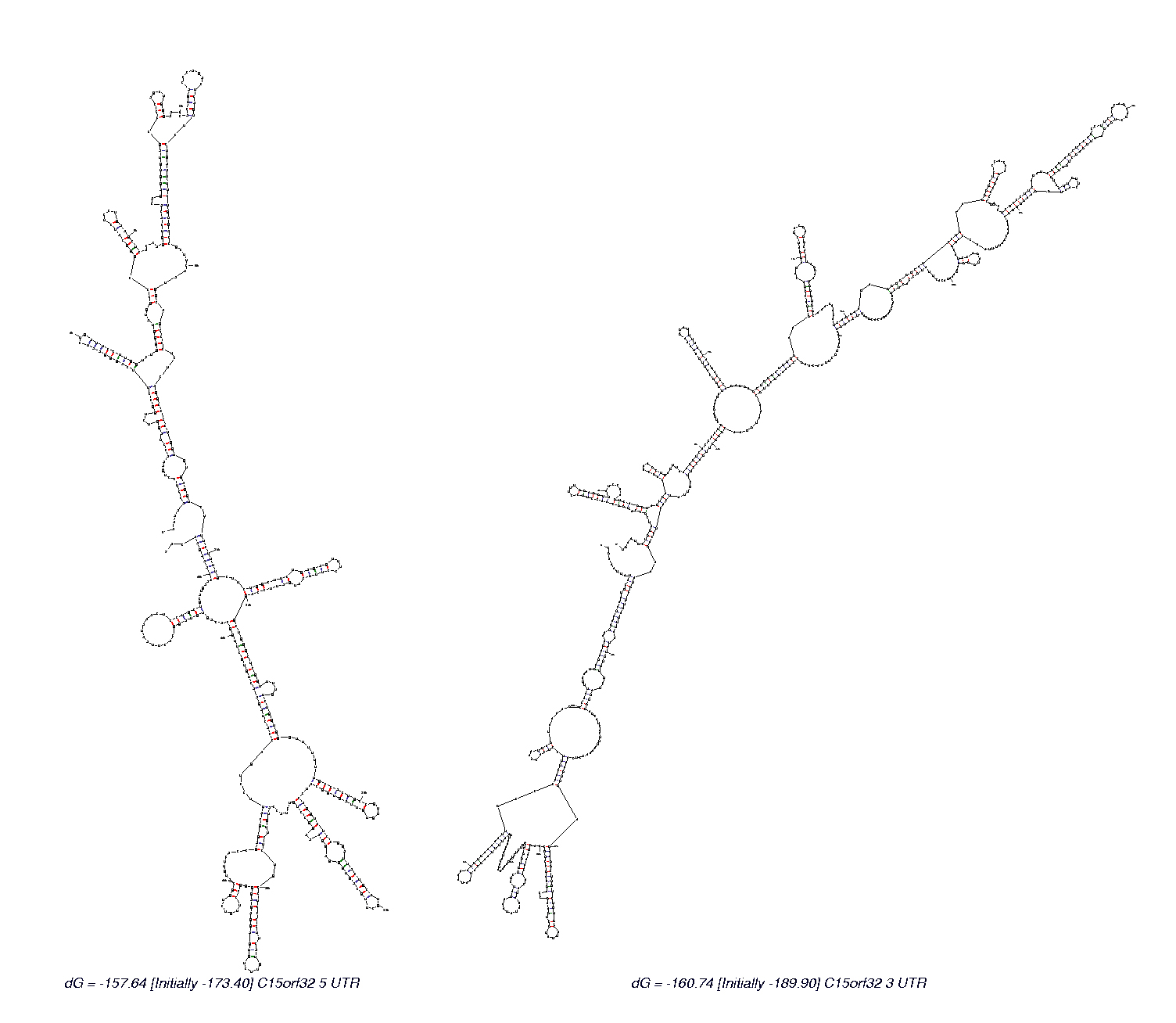
Possible secondary structures of the 5' and 3' UTR C15orf32 mRNA, predicted by mfold

=== Transcript level ===
Possible secondary structures of the 5' and 3' untranslated region in C15orf32 mRNA is given to the left and was predicted by mfold. It is mostly linear, with a number of small stem-loops. According to TargetScan, sites targeted by miRNA families miR-193a-5p and miR-365-3p within the 3' UTR are broadly conserved among vertebrates.

=== Protein level ===
Immunohistochemical staining shows that C15orf32 is localized within cells to the cytoplasm and membranes, including the nucleus. Both PSORTII and DeepLoc strongly predict localization to the nucleus. Thr41 has been shown to be phosphorylated post-translation 26 other potential phosphorylation sites were predicted using NetPhos, with the most likely phosphorylation sites being 6S by PKC, 32T by PKG, 83T by PKC, 89S by PKC, and 162S by PKA. A sumoylation site is predicted at amino acids 107–110. 11 mucin type GalNAc O-glycosylation were predicted using NetOGlyc, 9 of which occurred in the first 50 base pairs.

== Interactions ==
Experimental evidence shows potential interaction between C15orf32 and PKD2, ALG9, DISP1, NPC1, FZD2, FAM69A, ATP6V1G2, ASIC1, DPY19L4, SPPL2B, and HGSNAT.

== Clinical significance ==
Variants of C15orf32 has been linked to several traits through genome wide association studies. The rs8040009 SNP in the 3' UTR had a strong association with bipolar I disorder in a population of Han Chinese. Three SNPs within C15orf32, including rs1455773 in exon 1 which causes a missense mutation from alanine to threonine at position 17, were also associated with bipolar disorder in an Australian cohort. This SNP was also linked to alcohol use disorder and heaviness of drinking. The rs1455774 SNP, located in the 5' UTR, is located within the target sites of miRNA has-miR-539 and has-let-7i* which affects the expression of these miRNAs, which may increase breast cancer susceptibility. The rs11635085 SNP was linked to increased antibody IgG levels after exposure to casein, a dietary antigen, in Mexican Americans. The rs1455782 SNP was linked to decreased forced vital capacity, which is a measure of pulmonary function. The rs12148722 SNP was mildly associated with velopharyngeal dysfunction. A haplotype block within C15orf32 was associated with acute myeloid leukemia. A deletion in 15q26.1 including genes ST8SIA2, C15orf32, and FAM174B was found in a patient with epilepsy and autism spectrum disorder.

== Homology ==
Homologs of C15orf32 have been described in 39 other mammals. No known orthologs exist outside of mammals.

Scientific name	Common name	Order	Date of divergence (MYA, estimated)	Sequence ID	Length	% Identity	% Similarity
Pan paniscus	Bonobo	Primates	6.7	XP_003816836.1	178	100.00	100
Colobus angolensis palliatus	Tanzanian black-and-white colobus	Primates	29.44	XP_011802791.1	165	81.21	83.03
Cebus capucinus imitator	Panamanian white-faced capuchin	Primates	43.2	XP_017372471.1	158	63.92	72.78
Marmota flaviventris	Yellow-bellied marmot	Rodentia	90	XP_027811208.1	171	53.80	61.99
Cavia porcellus	Guinea pig	Rodentia	90	XP_005008701.1	91	50.55	63.74
Urocitellus parryii	Arctic ground squirrel	Rodentia	90	XP_026249828.1	169	49.70	59.76
Heterocephalus glaber	Naked mole-rat	Rodentia	90	XP_021120379.1	157	47.77	56.69
Octodon degus	Common degu	Rodentia	90	XP_012369204.1	113	38.94	54.87
Ceratotherium simum simum	Southern white rhinoceros	Perissodactyla	96	XP_014644154.1	101	57.43	72.28
Tursiops truncatus	Common bottlenose dolphin	Artiodactyla	96	XP_019801175.1	120	53.33	67.5
Sus scrofa	Wild boar	Artiodactyla	96	XP_020955730.1	121	52.07	65.29
Balaenoptera acutorostrata scammoni	North Pacific Minke whale	Artiodactyla	96	XP_028020695.1	161	50.93	62.73
Equus caballus	Horse	Perissodactyla	96	XP_023505656.1	172	50.00	61.63
Felis catus	Cat	Carnivora	96	XP_006944424.1	89	49.44	58.43
Odobenus rosmarus divergens	Pacific walrus	Carnivora	96	XP_012420660.1	77	46.75	58.44
Lagenorhynchus obliquidens	Pacific white-sided dolphin	Artiodactyla	96	XP_026938944.1	180	44.44	55.56
Lipotes vexillifer	Baiji	Artiodactyla	96	XP_007472421.1	165	43.64	54.55
Panthera pardus	Leopard	Carnivora	96	XP_019315554.1	99	43.43	50.51
Orcinus orca	Killer whale	Artiodactyla	96	XP_012389158.1	162	43.21	53.7
Canis lupus dingo	Dingo	Carnivora	96	XP_025294087.1	149	36.24	44.3
