= J. J. Mikkola =

Finnish linguist and professor (1866-1946)

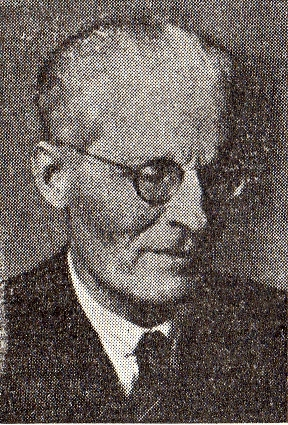
J.J. Mikkola as he appeared near the end of his life.

Jooseppi Julius (J. J.) Mikkola (July 6, 1866, Ylöjärvi – September 28, 1946, Helsinki), was a Finnish linguist and professor. Mikkola is regarded as one of the most important Finnish linguists of Slavic languages of his era.

== Biography ==
Mikkola's parents were farmer Antti Erland Mikkola and Johanna Mikkola. Mikkola graduated in 1886.

In 1893 Mikkola married Finnish author Maila Talvio.

Mikkola was politically in the extreme right, he was member of the fascist "Friends of the Young Italy" society and later in the Nazi Finnish Realm Union.

== Books ==
- Berührungen zwischen den westfinnischen und slavischen Sprachen, väitöskirja. Finsk-ugriska sällskapet, Helsingfors 1893–1895
- Betonung und Quantität in den westslavischen Sprachen. W. Hagelstam, Helsingfors 1899
- Kansallinen liike Böömissä. Kansanvalistusseura 1903
- Ladoga, Laatokka. Finsk-ugriska sällskapet, Helsingfors 1906
- Urslavische Grammatik : Einführung in das vergleichende Studium der slavischen Sprachen, 1 Teil – Lautlehre, Vokalismus, Betonung. Carl Winter's Universitätsbuchhandlung, Heidelberg 1913
- Die chronologie der turkischen Donaubulgaren. Suomalais-ugrilainen seura 1914
- Slaavilaiset kansat ajanlukumme ensimmäisellä vuosituhannella. Porvoo 1916
- Zur Vertretung der Gutturale und tj in den lateinischen Lehnwörtern des Germanischen und Slavischen. Société néophilologique, Helsingfors 1924
- Suomen ja suomalais-ugrilaisten kielten tutkimus. Helsinki 1929
- Kaksi pyhää Henrikkiä koskevaa muistiinpanoa, kirjoittajat Aarno Maliniemi ja J. J. Mikkola. Helsinki 1930
- Englantilais-suomalais-ruotsalais-saksalainen merisanasto, toimttaneet J. J. Mikkola ja R[udolf] Dillström. WSOY 1931
- Inkerinmaan kreikanuskoisten käännytyksestä vuosina 1683–1700. Suomen historiallinen seura, Helsinki 1932
- Antti Jalava tshekkiläisiin tutustumassa. Helsinki 1937
- Muutamia tietoja kenraali Casimir Ehrnroothin toiminnasta Bulgarian hallitusmiehenä. Helsinki 1938
- Onko suomen silta balttilaista alkuperää? Helsinki 1938
- Die älteren Berührungen zwischen Ostseefinnisch und Russisch. Suomalais-ugrilainen seura 1938
- Hämärän ja sarastuksen ajoilta. WSOY 1939
- Reposaaren nimestä, teoksessa Satakunta XI. 1939
- Kolttakylän arkisto, Lapin sivistysseuran julkaisuja n:o 8. WSOY 1941
- Lännen ja idän rajoilta : : historiallisia kirjoitelmia. WSOY 1942
- Urslavische Grammatik : Einführung in das vergleichende Studium der slavischen Sprachen, 2 Teil – Konsonantismus. Carl Winter's Universitätsbuchhandlung, Heidelberg 1942
- Urslavische Grammatik : Einführung in das vergleichende Studium der slavischen Sprachen, 3 Teil – Formenlehre. Carl Winter's Universitätsverlag, Heidelberg 1950
