= Minerva Foundation Institute for Medical Research =

Finnish research institute

Minerva Foundation Institute for Medical Research is a private research institute, funded and maintained by the Minerva Foundation. The Minerva Foundation was founded in 1959. The research institute is located in Meilahti at Biomedicum Helsinki Finland, in a large conglomerate of modern laboratories with research groups in the biomedical and medical research fields. The institute features seven research groups with about 40 employees.

== Research groups ==
- Cardiovascular disease in the young research group, principal investigator: adjunct professor Taisto Sarkola
- Cellular neuroscience research group, principal investigator: adjunct professor Pirta Hotulainen
- Cardiovascular research group, principal investigator: adjunct professor Päivi Lakkisto
- Endocrinology research group, principal investigator: professor Hannele Yki-Järvinen
- Metabolism research group, principal investigator: adjunct professor Heikki Koistinen
- Lipid signaling and homeostasis research group, principal investigator (and director of the institute): professor Vesa Olkkonen
- Membrane biology research group, principal investigator: professor Elina Ikonen
- Associated group: Neuronal signaling research group, principal investigator: professor Dan Lindholm
