= Imputation (genetics) =

Statistical inference of unobserved genotypes

In genetics, genotype imputation is a statistical method used to infer unobserved or missing genotypes. It is achieved by using patterns of genetic variation, such as shared haplotypes and linkage disequilibrium, together with a reference panel that contains genetic information from other individuals in order to estimate the most likely genotypes at the unmeasured positions.

Genetic imputation is commonly used in genetic epidemiology, quantitative genetics and genome-wide association studies(QWAS). These studies investigate the relationships between genetic variation and traits, including one's chance of contracting a disease. By estimating genotypes at variants that were not directly measured, imputation increases the number of genetic variants available for analysis without needing the researchers to sequence each variant in every individual.

Imputation is most commonly applied to single-nucleotide polymorphisms (SNPs), which are variations at individual nucleotide positions in DNA. It can also be used to infer other types of genetic variation when suitable reference data and methods are available. The accuracy of genotype imputation depends of factors including the quality of the observed genetic data, the size and composition of the reference panel, the frequency of variants being inferred, and the similarity between the study and reference populations.

== Context ==
In genetic epidemiology and quantitative genetics, researchers aim to identify genomic locations where genetic variation between individuals is associated with variation in specific traits. These traits may include physical characteristics, biological measurements, or susceptibility to a certain disease. To study these relationships, researchers need access to the genetic makeup of a set of individuals. Sequencing the entire genome of each individual in the study is often too costly, so only a subset of the genome can be measured. This approach means only considering single-nucleotide polymorphisms (SNPs) and neglecting copy number variants. Along with this, researchers will also only be measuring SNPs known to be common enough in the population so much so that they are likely to be also common in the set of individuals under consideration. The most informative subset of SNPs is chosen based on the distribution of common genetic variation along the genome, using reference sources such as the International HapMap Project or the 1000 Genomes Project in humans. These SNPs are then incorporated into a SNP micro-array, thereby allowing each individual in the study to be genotyped at all these SNPs simultaneously.

Genotyping arrays used in genome-wide association studies (GWAS) rely on tagging SNPs, which capture information about genetic variants through patterns of linkage disequilibrium; therefore, these arrays do not directly measure all variation within the genome. Imputation addresses this limitation by using a reference panel that has been made for a greater number of variants to estimate genotypes that were not measured directly. As a consequence, one can assess the effect of more SNPs than those on the original micro-array. Importantly, imputation has facilitated meta-analysis of datasets that have been genotyped on different arrays, by increasing the overlap of variants available for analysis between arrays.

As whole-genome sequencing (WGS) becomes less expensive, imputation finds another use: it can improve low-coverage sequencing data. Low coverage WGS reads by filling gaps and low-coverage areas, but still leaves some genotype data limited. Reference panels can be used to estimate the genotypes in this region. In this use case, imputation provides higher accuracies in comparison to the SNP array. Studies have proven that imputation can achieve a high accuracy for ancient non-African ancestry at coverage as low as 0.5x, although it is dependent on ancestry, reference panel used, and amount of data available for sequencing.

== How Genetic Imputation Works Step-By-Step ==
Statistical methods are used to estimate the genetic variants that were not directly measured within a genetic study. The four main steps in this process can often be perceived as genotyping, phasing, comparison with reference panel, and statistical imputation.

Genotyping, the first step, is when DNA samples are taken and put through sequencing technology or genotyping microarray to be processed through the reading of specific genetic markers. Researchers filter markers that are poorly performing, have high missing rates, or ones that violate Hardy-Weinberg Equilibrium.

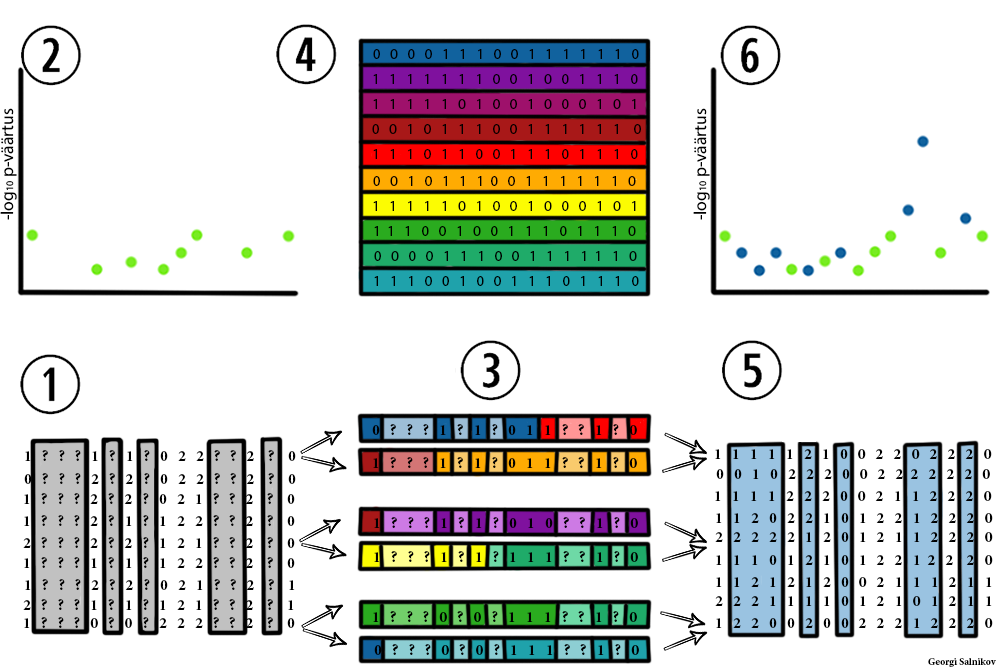
Imputeerimine(geneetika) pilt1 Georgi Salnikov

Phasing is when computers are used to separate the unphased diploid genotype data into individual chromosomes. The unphased diploid genotype is when parental and maternal alleles are lumped together, and the now individual chromosome product is known as a haplotype. Study data is typically pre-phased before matching using algorithms that are statistical such as Beagle.

Comparison is the step where the now phased haplotypes are then compared to a large reference panel, for example the 1000 Genomes Project. Algorithms are used to search for overlapping positions of markers to identify shared chromosomal segments and patterns of linkage disequilibrium that are inherited from common ancestors.

The last step, statistical imputation, uses frameworks like Hidden Markov models, software like Beagle will treat the reference panel that was used like a mosaic of ancestral haplotypes. The program used calculates probabilities for the missing or ungenotyped alleles based on how closely the target sequence matches the reference haplotypes, outputting estimated genotypes alongside confidence scores or allelic dosages.

== Tools ==
There are several software packages available to compare genotypes from a genotyping array to reference panels. They all differ in their statistical methods, computational requirements, supported datatypes, and reference panel compatibility.These tools include:

- MaCH - an early genotype-imputation and haplotype estimation program
- Minimac - a family of software tools developed for efficient genotype imputation using reference haplotypes
- IMPUTE2 - a program for imputing genotypes using reference haplotypes. and probabilistic statistical methods
- Beagle - a software package used for haplotype phasing and genotype imputation
- SHAPEIT - a family of software tools for haplotype phasing, including methods designed for large genetic datasets.

Choice of software depends on the size and type of dataset, reference panel, resources available, and the objective of the study.

Reference panels are also important in the imputation process. In early imputation usage, haplotypes from HapMap populations were used as reference panels. However, these have been superseded by the availability of haplotypes from the 1000 Genomes Project as reference panels with more samples across more diverse populations and with greater genetic marker density. As of mid-2014, whole-genome sequence data from the 1000 Genomes Project were publicly available for 2,535 individuals from 26 different populations around the world.

== Statistical models ==
Genotype imputation is closely related to haplotype estimation, or phasing, because both processes use patterns of genetic variation to infer unobserved information. Many widely used imputation methods are based on statistical models that represent a target haplotype as a mosaic of haplotypes observed in a reference panel. As of 2022, all modern phasing and imputation software are based on the Li & Stevens Hidden Markov Model construct. This describes how haplotypes can be represented through combinations of reference haplotypes, the differences between them being accounted for by mutation and recombination.

In an HMM-based imputation method, the hidden states represent possible reference or combinations of haplotypes, and the observed provide evidence about what states are likely. Transition probabilities model changes between reference haplotypes, and emission probabilities describe the relationship between observed data and underlying genetic states. These probabilities are used to estimate genotypes at the parts that were not observed directly. Methods that are more modern have improved the speed and scaling of imputation and phasing so that researchers can analyze large genetic datasets and reference panels. HMM approaches are still important, but imputation is something that continues to evolve along with its methods.
