= Jaakko Kaprio =

Finnish human geneticist

- Born: 23 April 1952 (age 73); Helsinki, Finland
- Education: University of Helsinki
- Known for: Twin studies
- Scientific career
- Fields: Genetic epidemiology Human genetics
- Institutions: University of Helsinki
- Thesis: The incidence of coronary heart disease in twin pairs discordant for cigarette smoking (1984)

Jaakko Arthur Kaprio (born 23 April 1952) is a Finnish human geneticist. He is Professor of Genetic Epidemiology at the Department of Public Health of the University of Helsinki, where he also leads the twin study project. He was director of the Finnish Institute for Molecular Medicine (FIMM) starting in October 2015, and ending on 31 January 2018. He formerly held a research professorship funded by the Academy of Finland for five years. He has also served as president of the Society for Research on Nicotine and Tobacco's European Chapter, the International Society for Twin Studies, and the Behavior Genetics Association.

In 2022, he was elected a member of the Academia Europaea.
