= Finnish Institute for Molecular Medicine =

Research institute in Finland

The Institute for Molecular Medicine Finland (FIMM) is an international research institute which investigates the molecular mechanism of diseases by methods involving genetics and medical systems biology. The research combines technology and high-level research with unique patients and biobank materials. The aim of FIMM is to transfer research data to medical use in healthcare, i.e. improving and promoting personalised medicine.

FIMM is member of EU-LIFE, an alliance of leading life sciences research centres in Europe.

== Organisation ==
FIMM was founded in 2007 as a joint research institute of University of Helsinki, the Hospital District of Helsinki and Uusimaa (HUS), Finnish Institute for Health and Welfare (THL) and the VTT Technical Research Centre of Finland. In 2017, FIMM became an independent operational unit of the new section of University of Helsinki, the Helsinki Institute of Life Science (HiLIFE). FIMM is located in the Biomedicum Helsinki research cluster.

The current director of FIMM since May 2023 is professor Samuli Ripatti. Ripatti is a successor to Mark Daly, who was recruited from Harvard University. Daly started his work in the spring of 2018. The previous directors of FIMM include professor Olli Kallioniemi (2007-2015) and academy professor Jaakko Kaprio (2016-2018). Professor Kallioniemi transferred to the Karolinska Institute in 2015 to become a Professor of Molecular Precision Medicine and Director of the Swedish research institute, SciLifeLab. Professor Eero Saksela acted as a project leader during the FIMM establishment phase (2007).
