= Mauno Vannas =

Finnish politician

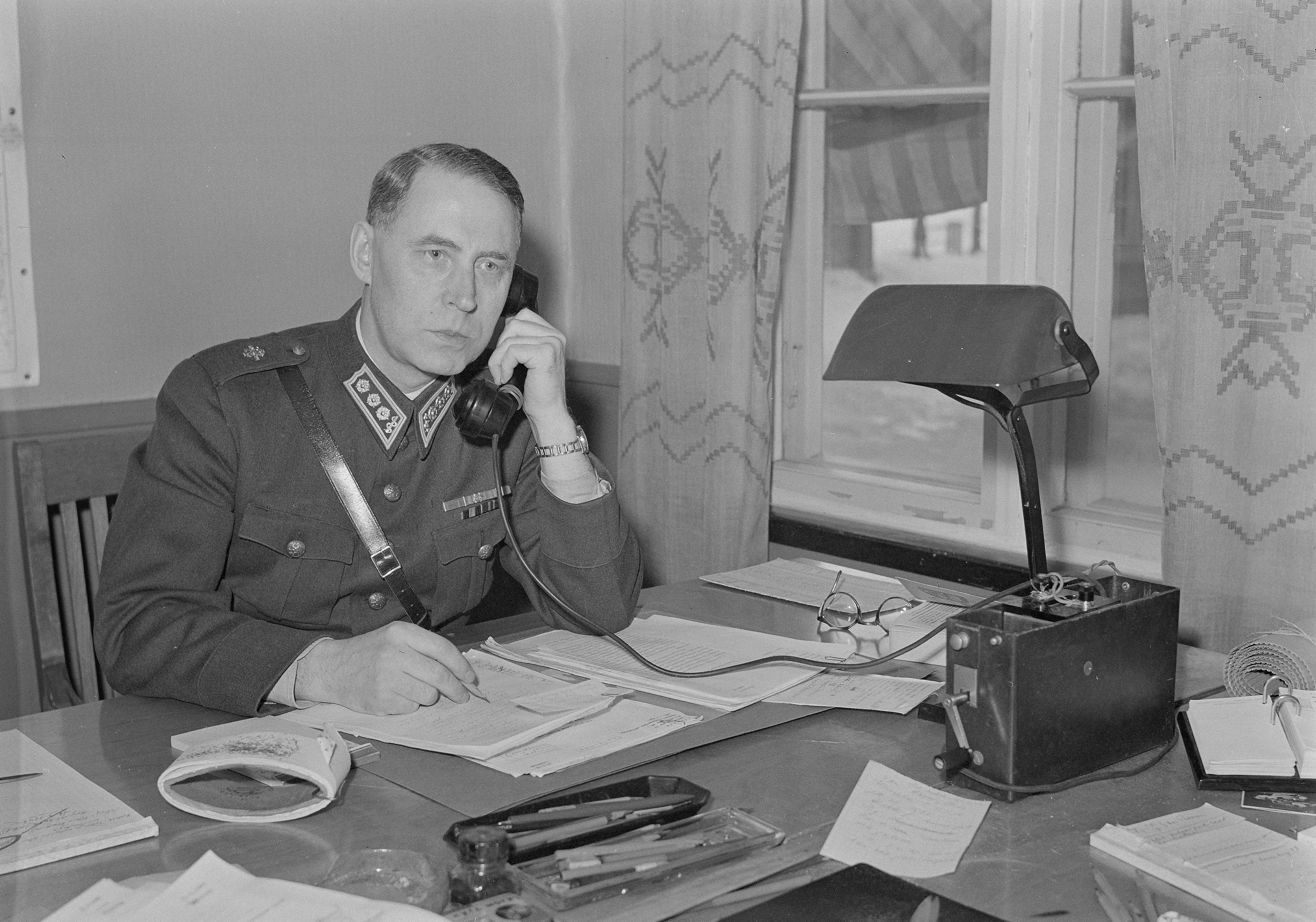

Mauno Viktor Vannas (until 1905 Johansson, 18 August 1891 Uusikaupunki - 19 December 1964 Helsinki) was a Finnish doctor, University of Helsinki permanent ophthalmology professor and inventor of Vannas' scissors.

== Studies and life as doctor in the military ==
Vannas completed his matriculation exam in Uusikaupunki yhteislyseo at the age of 19 in 1911. In the same year, his mother died and his further studies were overshadowed by other unfortunate events. Vannas enrolled in the Faculty of Law at the University of Helsinki but, at his father's urging, completed a degree in medicine in 1913. When Vanas's father drowned at work, Vannas was adopted as a foster child to the family of shipowner Carl Lundström.

Vannas graduated with a bachelor's degree in medicine in 1917, but his medical studies were now interrupted due to the Finnish Civil War. He became the Finnish Red Cross ambulance doctor, and was imprisoned by the Red Guard. He was released on 4 May 1918.

After the Civil War, Vannas served as a medical officer in the Hennala camp, the Ladoga Infantry Regiment, the Uusimaa Regiment, the Central Finland Regiment, the Vyborg Regiment, the Air Force and the Suomenlinna Garrison until 1926. In 1921 he was promoted to medical captain. Vannas was also awarded the Cross of Liberty.

Vannas completed his studies and graduated as a Licentiate of Medicine in 1923. He continued to work as a part-time military doctor at the Helsinki Military Hospital in the field of ophthalmology until 1937, when he became a professor.

Vannas became enthusiastic about Nazism after visiting Germany in the 1930s. He served as chairman of the Nazi Finnish Realm Union. Vannas met with the German military leadership and held meetings in 1941–1942. According to some researchers, the organization planned a National Socialist coup.

== Second World War ==
During the Winter War, Vannas served as chief physician at the Military Hospital and during the Continuation War at the Headquarters. He was promoted to medical colonel in 1942, and in 1943 he served on the committee of the Finnish Ophthalmologists' Association for the treatment of eye injuries caused by bombings. Vannas visited Germany twice during the war. In September 1941 he took part in the Paracelsus-celebrations in Salzburg, and in May 1943 he made a lecture trip to Königsberg.

After his experiences during the Finnish Civil War, Vannas became extreme right-winger. During World War II, he was asked to lead, among other things, the Nazi Finnish Realm Union, which included forty professors, leading artists and businessmen. Vannes' term as chairman ended when he was assigned in February 1944 as the chief physician of Vilppula Military Hospital.

After the war, Vannas was on the list of suspected war criminals, but he avoided charges.

== International reputation ==
Vannas, who studied in the United States and Europe, had an internationally significant career in the field of ophthalmology and is still one of the most internationally known Finnish ophthalmologists. Vannas' published over 200 medical publications. He was a skilled surgeon who also developed surgical instruments such as the Vannas iris scissors in the 1940s and the Vannas scissors still in everyday use around the world in 1946. Originally left-handed but forced to be right-handed at school, Vannas used both hands equally well in the operating room. He made study trips to Sweden, Estonia, Latvia, Hungary, Austria, Germany, Italy, France, England, Czechoslovakia, Poland and the United States.

Vannas was particularly interested in glaucoma and corneal surgery. He started corneal transplants in Finland and was the first in the Nordic countries in the 1930s and founded Finland's first eye bank in 1956. In addition, he practiced strabismus -, glaucoma and scleroplasty surgery.

His project to build a new eye hospital began after the end of the war, and it began operations in the Meilahti hospital area in 1952.

Vannas resigned as professor at the age of 70 on 18 August 1961.

Vannas' city of birth Uusikaupunki has a memorial of Vannas cast from brass in a park in the intersection of Rantakatu and Blasieholmankatu.
