= Biomedicum Helsinki =

Medical research and training centre located in Meilahti district of Helsinki

- Established: 2001 (Building 1); 2008 (Building 2)
- Research type: Medical research and teaching center
- Location: Helsinki, Finland; 60°11′26″N 24°54′21″E
- Website: www.biomedicum.fi

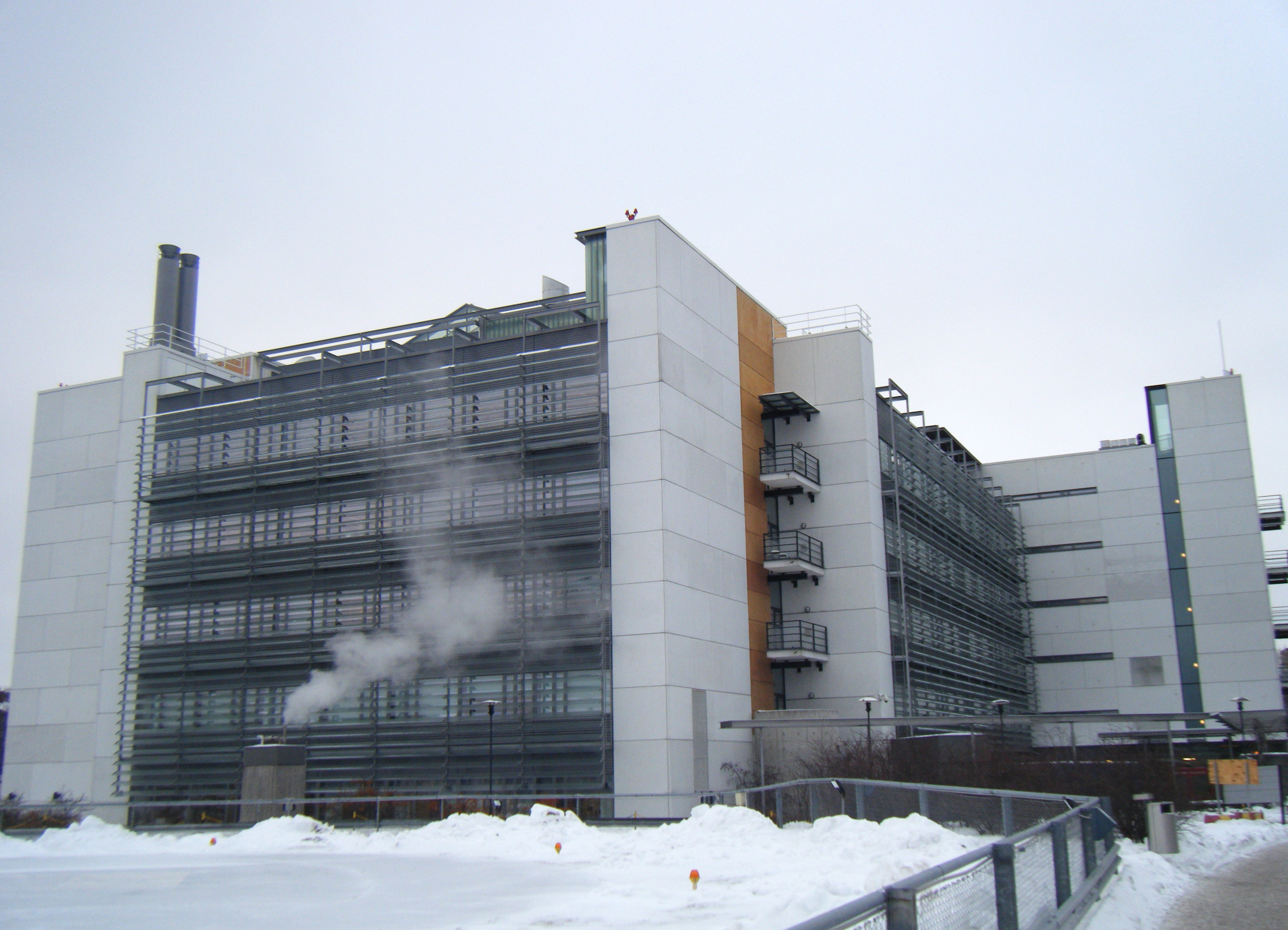
Biomedicum Helsinki, building 1

The Biomedicum Helsinki is a research and teaching center located in the Meilahti district of Helsinki, Finland. It contains two buildings (Biomedicum Helsinki 1 and 2), and features research and teaching facilities of the University of Helsinki's Faculty of Medicine, the Helsinki University Central Hospital, the EMBL Nordic partner Finnish Institute for Molecular Medicine, the Folkhälsan Research Center, the Minerva Foundation Institute for Medical Research, the Wihuri Research Institute, and several companies in the life science field.

Building 1 was completed in 2001 and Building 2 in 2008. A bridge named in honor of Konrad ReijoWaara (1853-1936), a prominent figure in the Medical Association Duodecim and the first editor-in-chief of the magazine of the same name, connects the buildings. The use of the buildings are coordinated by the Biomedicum Helsinki Foundation, which also funds research activities in the field of medicine.
