= Jenny and Antti Wihuri Foundation =

Finnish nonprofit organization

The Jenny and Antti Wihuri Foundation is a Finnish non-profit organization founded in 1942 by industrialist Antti Wihuri and his wife, Jenny Wihuri, with the purpose of supporting cultural and economic development in Finland. The Foundation awards scholarships and prizes on an annual basis on October 9, the birthday of Antti Wihuri. Between 1942 and 2016, the Foundation had awarded grants of 274 million of euros. In 2016, the total value of grants and prizes awarded by the Foundation amounted to 11,2 million euros.

== Wihuri Research Institute ==
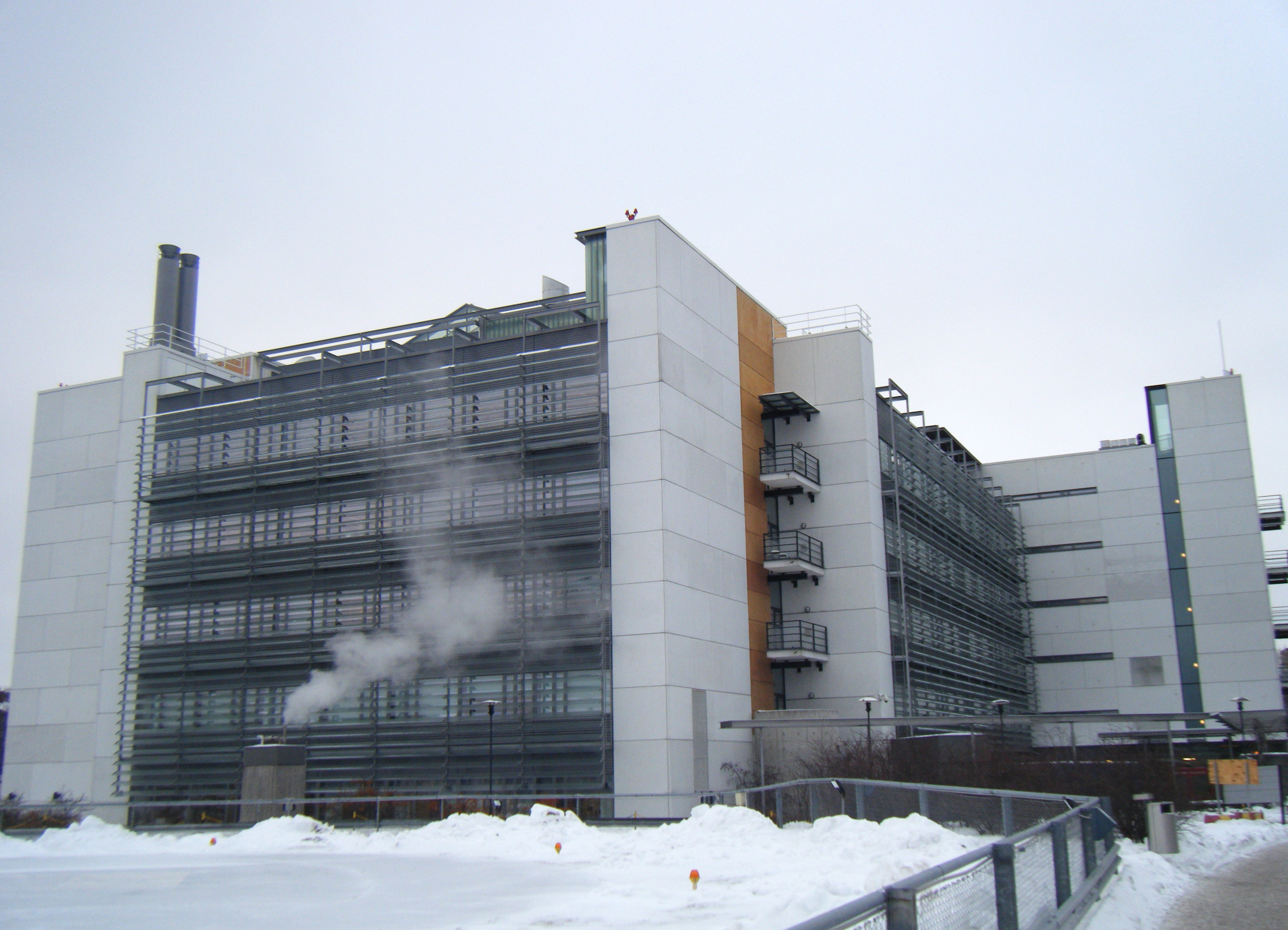
The Wihuri Research Institute is located in Biomedicum Helsinki, at the Meilahti Academic Medical Center.

The Jenny and Antti Wihuri Research Institute was founded in 1944 with the aim of creating the conditions for high-quality research in the field of natural sciences, medicine and technical sciences. The Wihuri Research Institute focuses on cardiovascular research, and is particularly renowned for the innovative research it conducts on major chronic diseases. The institute is currently headed by Professor Kari Alitalo.

== Art collection ==
Since 1957, the Jenny and Antti Wihuri Foundation has built up a large collection of Finnish contemporary art. In 1983, the Foundation's Board of Directors donated nearly 500 pieces of the collection to the City of Rovaniemi on the occasion of the 100th anniversary of Atti Wihuri's birth.

== Wihuri Foundation for International Prizes ==
The Wihuri Foundation for International Prizes was founded in 1953 by Antti Wihuri. The Fund's purpose is to distribute international awards, notably the Wihuri Sibelius Prize in recognition of creative work that has specially furthered and developed the cultural and economic progress of mankind. These prizes may be awarded to private individuals or organizations regardless of nationality, religion, race or language. Throughout its 62 years of operating the Foundation has awarded 35 prizes in total of which 18 have been Wihuri International Prize awarded to scientists.

=== Wihuri Sibelius Prize ===
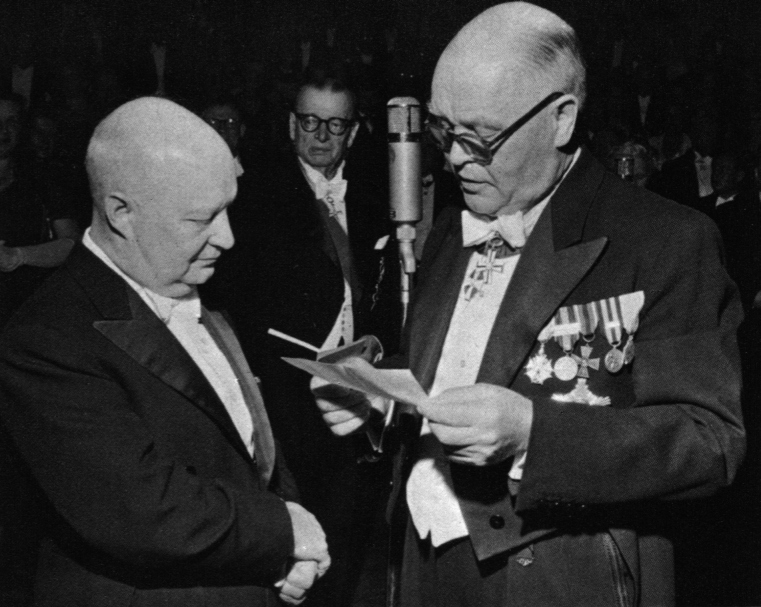
Antti Wihuri handing over the Wihuri Sibelius Prize to Paul Hindemith in 1955. In the back President Juho Kusti Paasikivi.

Year	Recipient	Country
1953	Jean Sibelius	Finland
1955	Paul Hindemith	Germany
1958	Dmitri Šostakovitš	Soviet Union
1963	Igor Stravinsky	United States
1965	Benjamin Britten	United Kingdom
1965	Erik Bergman	Finland
1965	Usko Meriläinen	Finland
1965	Einojuhani Rautavaara	Finland
1971	Olivier Messiaen	France
1973	Witold Lutoslawski	Poland
1973	Joonas Kokkonen	Finland
1983	Krzysztof Penderecki	Poland
1983	Aulis Sallinen	Finland
2000	György Ligeti	Italy / Austria
2003	Magnus Lindberg	Finland
2006	Per Nørgård	Denmark
2009	Kaija Saariaho	Finland
2012	György Kurtág	Hungary
2015	Harrison Birtwistle	United Kingdom

=== Wihuri International Prize ===
Year	Recipient	Country
1958	Rolf Nevanlinna	Finland
1961	Väinö Hovi	Finland
1961	Pentti I. Halonen	Finland
1968	John McMichael	United Kingdom
1968	Lars Ahlfors	United States
1971	Peter Hirsch	United Kingdom
1976	Georg Henrik von Wright	Finland
1976	Jaakko Hintikka	Finland
1979	Derrick B. Jelliffe	United States
1982	Aldo van Eyck	Netherlands
1983	Aksel C. Wiin-Nielsen	Denmark
1985	John Williams Mellor	United States
1988	Kullervo Kuusela	Finland
1991	Kari I. Kivirikko	Finland
1994	Olli V. Lounasmaa	Finland
1997	Niilo B. Hallman	Finland
2003	Barbara Czarniawska	Poland
2012	Merja Penttilä	Finland
2015	Thania Paffenholz	Switzerland
