= International HapMap Project =

Project that developed a haplotype map of the human genome

The International HapMap Project is an organization that aimed to develop a haplotype map (HapMap) of the human genome, to describe the common patterns of human genetic variation. HapMap is used to find genetic variants affecting health, disease and responses to drugs and environmental factors. The information produced by the project is made freely available for research.

The International HapMap Project is a collaboration among researchers at academic centers, non-profit biomedical research groups and private companies in Canada, China (including Hong Kong), Japan, Nigeria, the United Kingdom, and the United States. It officially started with a meeting on October 27 to 29, 2002, and was expected to take about three years. It comprises three phases; the complete data obtained in Phase I were published on 27 October 2005. The analysis of the Phase II dataset was published in October 2007. The Phase III dataset was released in spring 2009 and the publication presenting the final results published in September 2010.

== Background ==
Unlike with the rarer Mendelian diseases, combinations of different genes and the environment play a role in the development and progression of common diseases (such as diabetes, cancer, heart disease, stroke, depression, and asthma), or in the individual response to pharmacological agents. To find the genetic factors involved in these diseases, one could in principle do a genome-wide association study: obtain the complete genetic sequence of several individuals, some with the disease and some without, and then search for differences between the two sets of genomes. At the time, this approach was not feasible because of the cost of full genome sequencing. The HapMap project proposed a shortcut.

Although any two unrelated people share about 99.5% of their DNA sequence, their genomes differ at specific nucleotide locations. Such sites are known as single nucleotide polymorphisms (SNPs), and each of the possible resulting gene forms is called an allele. The HapMap project focuses only on common SNPs, those where each allele occurs in at least 1% of the population.

Each person has two copies of all chromosomes, except the sex chromosomes in males. For each SNP, the combination of alleles a person has is called a genotype. Genotyping refers to uncovering what genotype a person has at a particular site. The HapMap project chose a sample of 269 individuals and selected several million well-defined SNPs, genotyped the individuals for these SNPs, and published the results.

The alleles of nearby SNPs on a single chromosome are correlated. Specifically, if the allele of one SNP for a given individual is known, the alleles of nearby SNPs can often be predicted, a process known as genotype imputation. This is because each SNP arose in evolutionary history as a single point mutation, and was then passed down on the chromosome surrounded by other, earlier, point mutations. SNPs that are separated by a large distance on the chromosome are typically not very well correlated, because recombination occurs in each generation and mixes the allele sequences of the two chromosomes. A sequence of consecutive alleles on a particular chromosome is known as a haplotype.

To find the genetic factors involved in a particular disease, one can proceed as follows. First a certain region of interest in the genome is identified, possibly from earlier inheritance studies. In this region one locates a set of tag SNPs from the HapMap data; these are SNPs that are very well correlated with all the other SNPs in the region. Using these, genotype imputation can be used to determine (impute) the other SNPs and thus the entire haplotype with high confidence. Next, one determines the genotype for these tag SNPs in several individuals, some with the disease and some without. By comparing the two groups, one determines the likely locations and haplotypes that are involved in the disease.

== Samples used ==
Haplotypes are generally shared between populations, but their frequency can differ widely. Four populations were selected for inclusion in the HapMap: 30 adult-and-both-parents Yoruba trios from Ibadan, Nigeria (YRI), 30 trios of Utah residents of northern and western European ancestry (CEU), 44 unrelated Japanese individuals from Tokyo, Japan (JPT) and 45 unrelated Han Chinese individuals from Beijing, China (CHB). Although the haplotypes revealed from these populations should be useful for studying many other populations, parallel studies are currently examining the usefulness of including additional populations in the project.

All samples were collected through a community engagement process with appropriate informed consent. The community engagement process was designed to identify and attempt to respond to culturally specific concerns and give participating communities input into the informed consent and sample collection processes.

In phase III, 11 global ancestry groups have been assembled: ASW (African ancestry in Southwest USA); CEU (Utah residents with Northern and Western European ancestry from the CEPH collection); CHB (Han Chinese in Beijing, China); CHD (Chinese in Metropolitan Denver, Colorado); GIH (Gujarati Indians in Houston, Texas); JPT (Japanese in Tokyo, Japan); LWK (Luhya in Webuye, Kenya); MEX (Mexican ancestry in Los Angeles, California); MKK (Maasai in Kinyawa, Kenya); TSI (Tuscans in Italy); YRI (Yoruba in Ibadan, Nigeria).

Phase	ID	Place	Population	Detail
I/II	CEU	(United States)	Utah residents with Northern and Western European ancestry from the CEPH collection	Detail
I/II	CHB	(China)	Han Chinese in Beijing, China	Detail
I/II	JPT	(Japan)	Japanese in Tokyo, Japan	Detail
I/II	YRI	(Nigeria)	Yoruba in Ibadan, Nigeria	Detail
III	ASW	(United States)	African ancestry in the Southwest USA	Detail
III	CHD	(United States)	Chinese in metropolitan Denver, CO, United States	Detail
III	GIH	(United States)	Gujarati Indians in Houston, TX, United States	Detail
III	LWK	(Kenya)	Luhya in Webuye, Kenya	Detail
III	MKK	(Kenya)	Maasai in Kinyawa, Kenya	Detail
III	MXL	(United States)	Mexican ancestry in Los Angeles, CA, United States	Detail
III	TSI	(Italy)	Tuscans in Italy	Detail

Three combined panels have also been created, which allow better identification of SNPs in groups outside the nine homogenous samples: CEU+TSI (Combined panel of Utah residents with Northern and Western European ancestry from the CEPH collection and Tuscans in Italy); JPT+CHB (Combined panel of Japanese in Tokyo, Japan and Han Chinese in Beijing, China) and JPT+CHB+CHD (Combined panel of Japanese in Tokyo, Japan, Han Chinese in Beijing, China and Chinese in Metropolitan Denver, Colorado). CEU+TSI, for instance, is a better model of UK British individuals than is CEU alone.

== Scientific strategy ==
It was expensive in the 1990s to sequence patients' whole genomes. So the National Institutes of Health embraced the idea for a "shortcut", which was to look just at sites on the genome where many people have a variant DNA unit. The theory behind the shortcut was that, since the major diseases are common, so too would be the genetic variants that caused them. Natural selection keeps the human genome free of variants that damage health before children are grown, the theory held, but fails against variants that strike later in life, allowing them to become quite common (In 2002 the National Institutes of Health started a $138 million project called the HapMap to catalog the common variants in European, East Asian and African genomes).

For the Phase I, one common SNP was genotyped every 5,000 bases. Overall, more than one million SNPs were genotyped. The genotyping was carried out by 10 centres using five different genotyping technologies. Genotyping quality was assessed by using duplicate or related samples and by having periodic quality checks where centres had to genotype common sets of SNPs.

The Canadian team was led by Thomas J. Hudson at McGill University in Montreal and focused on chromosomes 2 and 4p. The Chinese team was led by Huanming Yang in Beijing and Shanghai, and Lap-Chee Tsui in Hong Kong and focused on chromosomes 3, 8p and 21. The Japanese team was led by Yusuke Nakamura at the University of Tokyo and focused on chromosomes 5, 11, 14, 15, 16, 17 and 19. The British team was led by David R. Bentley at the Sanger Institute and focused on chromosomes 1, 6, 10, 13 and 20. There were four United States' genotyping centres: a team led by Mark Chee and Arnold Oliphant at Illumina Inc. in San Diego (studying chromosomes 8q, 9, 18q, 22 and X), a team led by David Altshuler and Mark Daly at the Broad Institute in Cambridge, USA (chromosomes 4q, 7q, 18p, Y and mitochondrion), a team led by Richard Gibbs at the Baylor College of Medicine in Houston (chromosome 12), and a team led by Pui-Yan Kwok at the University of California, San Francisco (chromosome 7p).

To obtain enough SNPs to create the Map, the Consortium funded a large re-sequencing project to discover millions of additional SNPs. These were submitted to the public dbSNP database. As a result, by August 2006, the database included more than ten million SNPs, and more than 40% of them were known to be polymorphic. By comparison, at the start of the project, fewer than 3 million SNPs were identified, and no more than 10% of them were known to be polymorphic.

During Phase II, more than two million additional SNPs were genotyped throughout the genome by David R. Cox, Kelly A. Frazer and others at Perlegen Sciences and 500,000 by the company Affymetrix.

== Data access ==
All of the data generated by the project, including SNP frequencies, genotypes and haplotypes, were placed in the public domain and are available for download. The website was retired in 2016, however the original data is still available for download. The website used to contain a genome browser which allows to find SNPs in any region of interest, their allele frequencies and their association to nearby SNPs. A tool that can determine tag SNPs for a given region of interest was also provided. These data can also be directly accessed from the widely used Haploview program.

== Publications ==
- International HapMap Consortium (2003). "The International HapMap Project" (PDF). Nature. 426 (6968): 789–796. Bibcode:2003Natur.426..789G. doi:10.1038/nature02168. hdl:2027.42/62838. PMID 14685227. S2CID 4387110.
- International HapMap Consortium (2004). "Integrating ethics and science in the International HapMap Project". Nature Reviews Genetics. 5 (6): 467–475. doi:10.1038/nrg1351. PMC 2271136. PMID 15153999.
- International HapMap Consortium (2005). "A haplotype map of the human genome". Nature. 437 (7063): 1299–1320. Bibcode:2005Natur.437.1299T. doi:10.1038/nature04226. PMC 1880871. PMID 16255080.
- International HapMap Consortium (2007). "A second generation human haplotype map of over 3.1 million SNPs". Nature. 449 (7164): 851–861. Bibcode:2007Natur.449..851F. doi:10.1038/nature06258. PMC 2689609. PMID 17943122.
- International HapMap 3 Consortium (2010). "Integrating common and rare genetic variation in diverse human populations". Nature. 467 (7311): 52–58. Bibcode:2010Natur.467...52T. doi:10.1038/nature09298. PMC 3173859. PMID 20811451.
- Deloukas P, Bentley D (2004). "The HapMap project and its application to genetic studies of drug response". The Pharmacogenomics Journal. 4 (2): 88–90. doi:10.1038/sj.tpj.6500226. PMID 14676823.
- Thorisson GA, Smith AV, Krishnan L, Stein LD (2005). "The International HapMap Project Web site". Genome Research. 15 (11): 1592–1593. doi:10.1101/gr.4413105. PMC 1310647. PMID 16251469.
- Terwilliger JD, Hiekkalinna T (2006). "An utter refutation of the 'Fundamental Theorem of the HapMap'". European Journal of Human Genetics. 14 (4): 426–437. doi:10.1038/sj.ejhg.5201583. PMID 16479260.
- Secko, David (2005). "Phase I of the HapMap Complete". The Scientist

== See also ==
- Genealogical DNA test
- The 1000 Genomes Project
- Population groups in biomedicine
- Human Variome Project
- Human genetic variation
