= Track hub =

A track hub is a structured directory of genomic data, such as gene expression or epigenetic data, viewable over the web with a genome browser. Track hubs are defined by the track hub standard. Originally developed as part of the UCSC genome browser, they are now supported by Ensembl and BioDalliance.

Track hubs are a useful and efficient tool for visualizing large data sets. Collections of wiggle plots produced by a transcriptomics study can be organized hierarchically into so called composite and super-tracks.
