= IGB =

IGB may refer to:

- Inner German border, the former frontier between West Germany and the German Democratic Republic (East Germany)
- Integrated Genome Browser, a genome browser
- Carl R. Woese Institute for Genomic Biology, a genomics research facility at University of Illinois in Urbana-Champaign, United States
- Institute for Genomics and Bioinformatics, a research facility at the University of California Irvine, United States
- igb: Intel Gigabit Ethernet driver software
- Irish Greyhound Board, the English language name for the Bord na gCon
- Gas Interconnector Greece–Bulgaria, is a natural gas pipeline between Greece and Bulgaria
- Leibniz-Institut für Gewässerökologie und Binnenfischere, also known as the Leibniz Institute of Freshwater Ecology and Inland Fisheries
