= Distributed Annotation System/Clients =

This table of client applications for the Distributed Annotation System has been created primarily for inclusion in its parent page. The parent page puts the table in context, and you should go there for more information. The table is provided in a separate page so that it can be transcluded where necessary.

== Table follows ==
Name	Description	Links
BioJava DAS Client		
Dasty	A web client for visualizing protein sequence feature information using DAS	
DasView	A server-side Perl application. This tool is mentioned in the original DAS publication, but has subsequently disappeared.	
EnsEMBL	The EnsEMBL Genome Browser. Provides built-in support for DAS	
Geodesic	An stand-alone Java application	
IGB	The Integrated Genome Browser (IGB, pronounced "ig-bee") is an application built upon the GenoViz SDK and Genometry for visualization and exploration of genomes and corresponding annotations from multiple data sources	
Jalview	A multiple sequence alignment editor & viewer	
OmniGene	The user interface is based on the EnsEMBL interface	
SIMAP	Similarity Matrix of Proteins	
SPICE	A browser for the annotations for protein sequences and structures	
STRAP	Underlining sequence features in multiple alignments. Example output:	
TIGR DAS Viewer		
WormBase	The WormBase genome Browser. Includes a DAS viewer named DASView	
