= Integrated Genome Browser =

Bioinformatics software

Integrated Genome Browser (IGB)
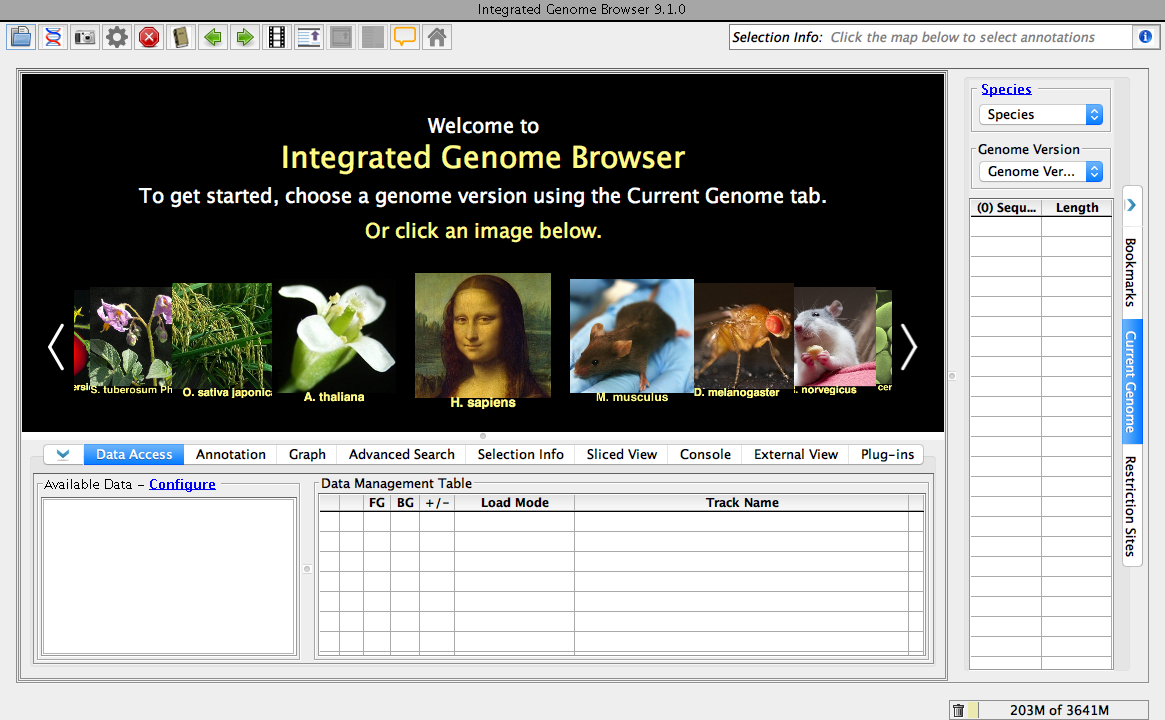
- Version 9.1.0 home screen
- Operating system: UNIX, Linux, Mac, MS-Windows
- Type: Bioinformatics tool
- License: CPL 1.0
- Website: bioviz.org

Integrated Genome Browser (IGB) (pronounced Ig-Bee) is an open-source genome browser, a visualization tool used to observe biologically interesting patterns in genomic data sets, including sequence data, gene models, alignments, and data from DNA microarrays.

== History ==
Integrated Genome Browser was first developed at Affymetrix for their scientists and public sector collaborators to visualize data from genome-wide tiling arrays. The first iterations of IGB were developed using funding from NIH awarded to company scientists Gregg Helt and Tom Gingeras. In 2004, Affymetrix released IGB as open source software, along with the Genoviz SDK, a graphics library for building genome browser applications. The first release of the code base was done as a compressed file archive. Soon after, the code was imported into a new repository at SourceForge. Since then, all development has proceeded in public under an open source model. In early 2008, a group led by former Affymetrix employee Ann Loraine began developing and maintaining IGB, supported by funding from the National Science Foundation and new investigator funds from UNC Charlotte. Since then, Loraine, her students, and collaborators have added many new features and capabilities, notably support for visualizing high-throughput sequencing data from Illumina and other platforms. In 2014, they migrated the source code to a git repository at Bitbucket.

In 2020, Oracle's Java Magazine named the Integrated Genome Browser as one of the 25 greatest Java apps ever written.

== Description ==
IGB is built on top of the Genoviz SDK, a Java library that implements key visualization features such as dynamic, real-time zooming and scrolling through a genomic map, a feature of the IGB browser that sets it apart from many similar tools.

IGB is also distinguished by the ease with which individual labs can set up data source servers to share data, notably, via REST-style Web services (Distributed Annotation System) and a simple file-system based approach called QuickLoad.

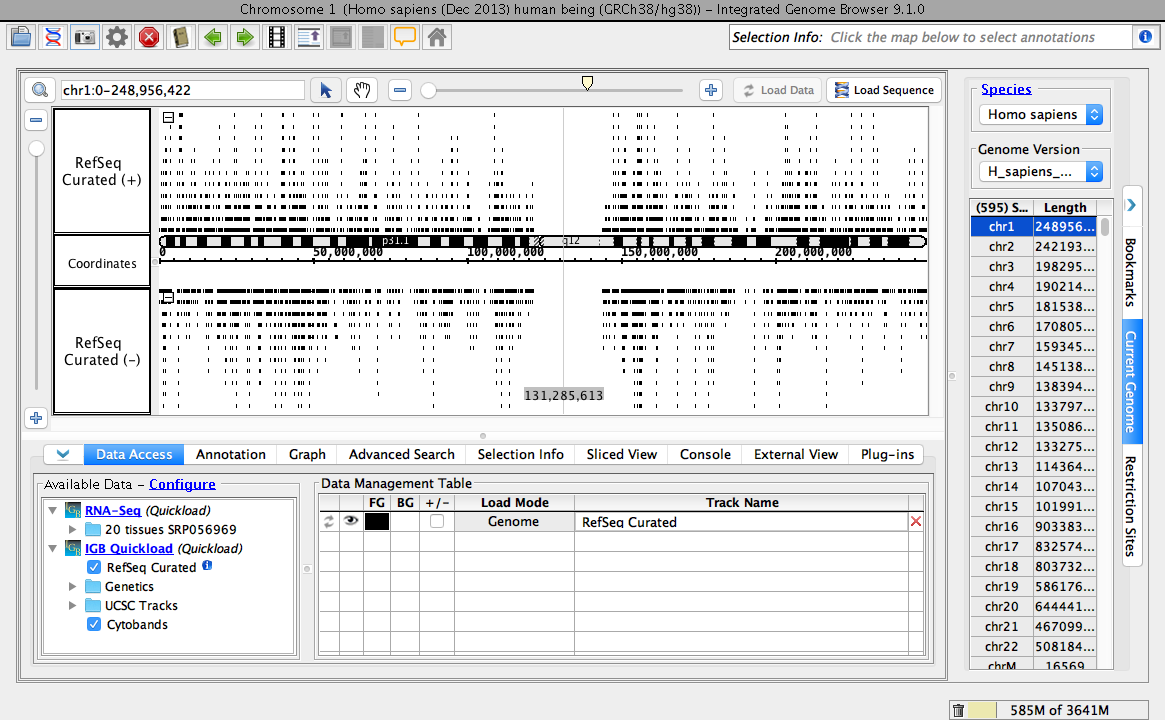
IGB 9.1.0 showing human genome

== Supported formats ==
IGB reads data in dozens of formats, including BAM, BED, Affymetrix CHP, FASTA, GFF, GTF, PSL, SGR, and WIG. The most up-to-date list is available at the BioViz Wiki.

IGB can output visualized data in dozens of formats via the FreeHEP library. These include EPS, PostScript, PDF, EMF, SVG, SWF, CGM, GIF, PNG, and PPM.
