= UCSC Malaria Genome Browser =

UCSC Malaria Genome Browser is a bioinformatic research tool to study the malaria genome, developed by Hughes Undergraduate Research Laboratory together with the laboratory of Prof. Manuel Ares Jr. at the University of California, Santa Cruz.

The web interface and database structure is based on the UCSC Genome Browser. UCSC Malaria Genome Browser brings together on a single screen the full DNA sequences of several species of the malaria parasite (Plasmodium sp.), alongside experimental results and previously discovered genes collected from the literature. The program allows users to search through 14 chromosomes of the malaria parasite's genome, enter their own sequence data and notes, and compare findings across species. The Malaria Genome Browser also supports text and sequence based searches that provide quick, precise access to any region of specific interest in the malaria genome. This site contains the reference genome sequence and working draft assembly for Plasmodium falciparum from PlasmoDb, the Plasmodium genome database build 5.0.
