= DcGO =

Ontology database for protein domains

dcGO
Content
- Description: The dcGO database is a comprehensive domain-centric ontology resource for protein domains.
- Data types captured: Protein domains, ontologies

Contact
- Research center: University of Bristol
- Primary citation: PMID 23161684

Access
- Website: The dcGO website
- Download URL: dcGO DOWNLOAD

Tools
- Web: PSnet, sTOL, dcGOR, dcGO Predictor, dcGO Enrichment

dcGO is a comprehensive ontology database for protein domains. As an ontology resource, dcGO integrates Open Biomedical Ontologies from a variety of contexts, ranging from functional information like Gene Ontology to others on enzymes and pathways, from phenotype information across major model organisms to information about human diseases and drugs. As a protein domain resource, dcGO includes annotations to both the individual domains and supra-domains (i.e., combinations of two or more successive domains).

== Concepts ==
There are two key concepts behind dcGO. The first concept is to label protein domains with ontology, for example, with Gene Ontology. That is why it is called dcGO, domain-centric Gene Ontology. The second concept is to use ontology-labeled protein domains for, for example, protein function prediction. Put it in a simple way, the first concept is about how to create dcGO resource, and the second concept is about how to use dcGO resource.

== Timelines ==
- In 2010, the algorithm behind the dcGO was initially published as an improvement to the SUPERFAMILY database.
- In 2011, the 'dcGO Predictor' was ranked 10th in the 2011 CAFA competition when applied to Gene Ontology. This predictor is only domain-based method without machine learning.
- In 2012, the database was officially released, published in NAR database issue.
- In 2013, the webserver was improved to support many analyses using dcGO resource.
- In the early 2014, the 'dcGO Predictor' was submitted for both function and phenotype predictions, ranked top in 4th in CAFA phenotype prediction.
- In the late 2014, an open-source R package dcGOR was developed to help analyse ontologies and protein domain annotations.

== Webserver ==
Recent use of dcGO is to build a domain network from a functional perspective for cross-ontology comparisons, and to combine with species tree of life (sTOL) to provide a phylogenetic context to function and phenotype.

== Software ==
Open-source software dcGOR is developed using R programming language to analyse domain-centric ontologies and annotations. Supported analyses include:

- easy access to a wide range of ontologies and their domain-centric annotations;
- able to build customised ontologies and annotations;
- domain-based enrichment analysis and visualisation;
- construction of a domain (semantic similarity) network according to ontology annotations;
- significance analysis for estimating a contact (statistical significance) network using random walker algorithm;
- high-performance parallel computing.

Functionalities under active development are:

- algorithm and implementations for creating domain-centric ontology annotations;
- ontology term prediction for input protein domain architectures;
- reconstruction of ancestral discrete characters using maximum likelihood/parsimony.

== See also ==
- SCOP
- Pfam
- InterPro
- Structural domain
- Gene Ontology
