= Journal of Molecular Biology =

- Discipline: Molecular biology
- Language: English
- Edited by: Michael F. Summers

Publication details
- History: 1959–present
- Publisher: Elsevier
- Frequency: Biweekly
- Open access: Hybrid
- Impact factor: 4.7 (2023)

Standard abbreviations
- ISO 4: J. Mol. Biol.

Indexing
- CODEN: JMOBAK
- ISSN: 0022-2836 (print); 1089-8638 (web)
- LCCN: 61019997
- OCLC no.: 1782923

Links
- Journal homepage; Online archive

The Journal of Molecular Biology is a biweekly peer-reviewed scientific journal covering all aspects of molecular biology. It was established in 1959 by Academic Press in London. It is currently published by Elsevier. The editor-in-chief was Peter Wright (The Scripps Research Institute) for the last 33 years. He has been succeeded by Michael F. Summers (University of Maryland Baltimore County).

== Abstracting and indexing ==
The journal is abstracted and indexed in:

- Biological Abstracts
- BIOSIS Previews
- Chemical Abstracts Service
- Current Contents/Life Sciences
- Embase
- EMBiology
- Index Medicus/MEDLINE/PubMed
- Science Citation Index
- Scopus

According to the Journal Citation Reports, the journal has a 2023 impact factor of 4.7.

== Notable articles ==
Some of the most highly cited articles that have appeared in the journal are:

- Monod, J.; Wyman, J.; Changeux, J.-P. (1965). "On the Nature of Allosteric Transitions: A Plausible Model". Journal of Molecular Biology. 12: 88–118. doi:10.1016/S0022-2836(65)80285-6. PMID 14343300., in which Jacques Monod, Jeffries Wyman, and Jean-Pierre Changeux presented the MWC model, that explained the cooperativity exhibited by allosteric proteins, such as hemoglobin.
- Southern, E. M. (1975). "Detection of specific sequences among DNA fragments separated by gel electrophoresis". Journal of Molecular Biology. 98 (3): 503–517. doi:10.1016/S0022-2836(75)80083-0. PMID 1195397., in which Edwin Southern presented the first description of nucleic acid blotting, a technique that revolutionized the field of molecular biology.
- Smith, T.; Waterman, M.S. (1981). "Identification of common molecular subsequences". Journal of Molecular Biology. 147 (1): 195–197. doi:10.1016/0022-2836(81)90087-5. PMID 7265238., in which the Smith–Waterman algorithm for determining the degree of homology of DNA, RNA, or protein sequences was first described.
- Altschul, Stephen; Gish, Warren; Miller, Webb; Myers, Eugene; Lipman, David (1990). "Basic local alignment search tool". Journal of Molecular Biology. 215 (3): 403–410. doi:10.1016/S0022-2836(05)80360-2. PMID 2231712., in which the nucleic acid and protein homology search algorithm known as BLAST was originally described.
