= Formatdb =

formatdb is a discontinued software tool that was used in molecular bioinformatics to format protein or nucleotide databases for BLAST. It has been replaced by makeblastdb and the NCBI "strongly encourage[s]" users to stop using formatdb.

formatdb must be used in order to format protein or nucleotide source databases before these databases can be searched by BLAST. The source database may be in either FASTA or ASN.1 format. Although the FASTA format is most often used as input to formatdb, the use of ASN.1 is advantageous for those who are using ASN.1 as the common source for other formats such as the GenBank report.

The opposite of operation of formatdb, extracting sequences from a blast formatted database, can be achieved by using the fastacmd program, which comes in the same package.

In the BLAST+ version, formatdb has been succeeded by makeblastdb.
