= Michael Summers =

Michael Summers may refer to:

- Michael G. Summers (born 1972), American State Delegate from Maryland
- Mike Summers (born 1952), Falkland Islands politician
- Michael F. Summers, American Biochemist

== See also ==
- Michael Sommer (disambiguation)
