= Mark Boguski =

American pathologist (died 2021)

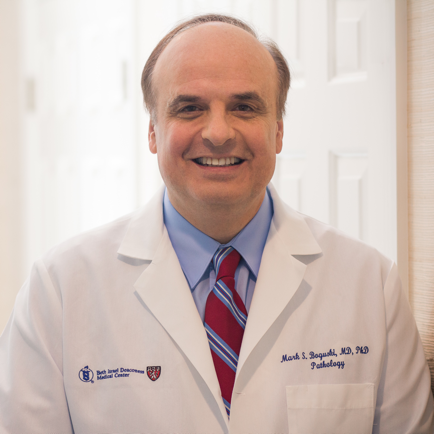
- Boguski in September 2013

Mark S. Boguski (died March 18, 2021) was an American pathologist specializing in computational analysis and structural biology. In 2001, he was elected to both the U.S. National Academy of Medicine and the American College of Medical Informatics.

== Education ==
In December 1986, Boguski earned his M.D. from the Washington University School of Medicine and his Ph.D. in molecular biology from the Division of Biology and Biomedical Sciences' Medical Scientist Training Program in St. Louis, Missouri. He was the first graduate student to be mentored by Jeffrey I. Gordon.

In 1989, Boguski became a Medical Staff Fellow under David J. Lipman at the National Institute of Diabetes and Digestive and Kidney Diseases at the United States' National Institutes of Health. He joined the National Center for Biotechnology Information as an investigator in 1990 and was tenured as a senior investigator in 1995.

== Career ==
Boguski served on the faculties of the National Institutes of Health, the Johns Hopkins University School of Medicine, Harvard Medical School, and as an executive in the biotechnology and pharmaceutical industries. He was a former vice president and global head of Genome and Protein Sciences at Novartis. In 2014, he became the chief medical officer of Liberty BioSecurity, LLC and founded the Precision Medicine Network.

He previously served as editor-in-chief of Genomics and has written a series of books titled Reimagining Cancer.

== Research ==
=== Bioinformatics and computational biology ===
Boguski's work in computational biology included algorithm development (e.g., Gibbs sampling, text mining), database design, development and implementation (dbEST, XREFdb, ArrayDB), data mining, data analysis and data annotation. One database effort in particular, the database of Expressed Sequence Tags (dbEST, 1993), has contributed to gene discovery and succeeding generations of genomics applications for transcript mapping, design and construction of microarrays, in silico discovery of single nucleotide polymorphisms and analysis and annotation of the human genome.

=== Genome and proteome research ===
- Bugoski's research group coined the term comparative genomics in 1995 to describe their work on the large-scale sequence analysis of homologs of human disease genes in model organisms. The first comparative genomics database, XREFdb, was compiled from the group's studies of thousands of gene sets from humans, rats, mice, Drosophila, nematodes, and yeast. XREFdb established the basic evolutionary parameters for the interpretation of conserved, protein-encoding genes in the human genome.
- Transcript Mapping - Clusters of human genes and ESTs ("UniGenes") were utilized to construct the first comprehensive transcript map of the human genome (1996, 1998). Historically, this was the first instance of the academic journal Science using the World Wide Web to publish results, provide hyper-linked information resources, and supplemental data sets. These maps facilitated and accelerated the positional cloning of hundreds of genes, and this mapping approach was applied to other organisms.
- Functional Genomics - Boguski's group used human UniGenes to design and construct the first human cDNA microarray (representing 10,000 genes). Boguski's group was also the first to provide a rigorous definition of functional genomics for the community. While on sabbatical at NHGRI, their group implemented the first relational database and analysis system, ArrayDB, for microarray data. This design was mirrored by numerous academic and commercial groups. The group had another first by applying methods of statistical text-mining to the interpretation of gene expression profiles. In the 2001 Genome Issue of Nature, they followed the first publication of the human genome sequence with a paper, showing how to use microarray technology to experimentally annotate and correct computational gene predictions.
- Pharmacogenomics - They cloned and sequenced the pregnane X receptor that encodes the key transcription factor regulating the expression of genes encoding drug and xenobiotic metabolizing enzymes. They also identified functional sequence polymorphisms in the promoters of these genes, cytochromes P450 3A (CYP3A), and studied the genotypes and corresponding molecular phenotypes in several populations differing in their drug-metabolizing abilities.
- Neurogeneomics - They pioneered the application of genome-scale approaches to neurobiology with the construction of a comprehensive, 3-dimensional transcript map of the mouse brain, the Allen Brain Atlas.
- Proteomics and Knowledge Mining - At Novartis, Boguski's division was responsible for the application of proteomics technologies and computational knowledge-mining Systems Biology for drug target and biomarker discovery.
