= DIAMOND (biotechnology) =

Bioinformatics software

- Original author: Benjamin J. Buchfink
- Developer: Benjamin J. Buchfink
- Release: November 17, 2014; 12 years ago
- Stable release: 2.2.8 / 20 September 2026; 58 days ago
- Written in: C++
- Operating system: UNIX, Linux, Mac, MS-Windows
- Type: Bioinformatics tool
- License: GNU General Public License version 3
- Repository: github.com/bbuchfink/diamond

In bioinformatics, DIAMOND is an algorithm and program for sequence alignment of protein and translated DNA sequences, designed as a fast alternative to NCBI BLAST. It has 20,000 citations in scientific literature (as of August 2026) and has been built into pipelines such as antiSMASH, OrthoFinder, HUMAnN2, eggNOG-mapper, BRAKER2, Anvi'o among others.

== Background ==
DTRA awarded a $1 million prize to fast alignment software defending against biothreats to the U.S. armed forces

Development of DIAMOND was begun in late 2012 by German computer scientist Benjamin J. Buchfink. An early predecessor version, then called SASS ("Sequence Alignment using Spaced Seeds"), was part of the winning entry of the U.S. Defense Threat Reduction Agency's $1 Million Algorithm Challenge. At the time, scientists were spending 800,000 CPU hours on a supercomputer to BLASTX their metagenomic reads against the KEGG database, creating the need for faster software solutions.

The first major version of DIAMOND was published in November 2014 and focused on alignment sensitivity at above 50% sequence identity and short read alignment. It reported performance gains of 600 to 22,000-fold vs BLAST and 23 to 500-fold vs RapSearch2.

The second major version of DIAMOND was published in April 2021 and extended the tool towards full pairwise alignment sensitivity (on par with BLAST) down to 20% sequence identity, reporting speedups of 12 to 15-fold vs state-of-the-art methods.

In 2021, DIAMOND was used to search through 10.2 petabases of sequencing data in the NCBI Sequence Read Archive, discovering 131,957 novel RNA virus species, thereby expanding the number of known species by roughly an order of magnitude. The computation was realized within 11 days, at a cost of US$23,980.

Sequence clustering is a downstream application of alignment. It was released as a feature in January 2023. In addition to clustering based on all-vs-all alignment, the tool also offers clustering with linear-time scaling and sensitivity at lower sequence identities that can be run in parallel across multiple compute nodes.

DIAMOND is one of 52 benchmarks in SPEC CPU®2026.

== Algorithm ==
Like all fast aligners, DIAMOND is based on the "seed-and-extend" concept to find short exact matches between query and target (also called subject) sequences, then extending them into longer gapped alignments. The seeds are usually chosen as k-mers or spaced k-mers in the case of DIAMOND, possibly also in a reduced alphabet.

DIAMOND is an acryonym for "Double Indexed Alignment of NGS Data", referring to its concept of building an index for both query and target sequences. Most aligners work by building an index data structure for the targets (database index), then linearly looking up query seeds in it. BLAST indexes the queries and linearly processes the database. DIAMOND indexes both queries and targets, then evaluates seed hits between them in a seed-by-seed order. The main advantage of this approach is better use of CPU caches by reusing cached data for all associated comparisons.

Seed hits are passed through several heuristic filter stages before being subjected to gapped Smith Waterman extension computing the final alignments.

== See also ==
- Needleman-Wunsch algorithm
- Smith-Waterman algorithm
- Sequence alignment
- Sequence alignment software
