= Michael Sommer (disambiguation) =

Michael Sommer (1952–2025) was a German trade unionist.

Michael Sommer may also refer to:

- Michael Sommer (runner), German runner in IAU 100 km World Championships
- Mike Sommer (1934–2022), American football running back

== See also ==
- Michael Summers (disambiguation)
