= Michael F. Summers =

American scientist

- Education: St. Petersburg Junior College; University of West Florida; Emory University
- Awards: Emily M. Gray Award; Presidential Award for Excellence in Science, Mathematics, and Engineering Mentoring
- Scientific career
- Fields: Biophysics; Biochemistry
- Workplaces: Howard Hughes Medical Institute; University of Maryland Baltimore County
- Thesis: Studies of B12 Analogs and Models Containing Bis (dimethylglyoximato) and Bis (salicylidine)-o-phenylenediamine as Equatorial Ligands (1984)
- Doctoral advisor: Luigi Marzilli
- Other academic advisors: Ad Bax

Michael Finley Summers is the Robert E. Meyerhoff Chair for Excellence in Research and Mentoring and a distinguished professor of chemistry and biochemistry at the University of Maryland, Baltimore County. He serves as editor-in-chief of the Journal of Molecular Biology. Since 1994, he has been a HHMI Investigator as well as a member of the National Academy of Sciences since 2016.

== Education and early life ==
Michael F. Summers earned his A.A. degree from St. Petersburg Junior College in 1978, and then a B.S. in chemistry from the University of West Florida in 1980. He then earned his Ph.D. in Bioinorganic Chemistry from Emory University in 1984.

== Career and research ==
From 1984 to 1987, he was a postdoctoral fellow at the NIH under Dr. Adrian Bax. Since 1987, he has been a UMBC Faculty member.

His career has focused on using structural approaches to studying protein, RNA, and macromolecular interactions with HIV-1 genome packaging and virus assembly. He is particularly well known for using NMR. He has also been a major proponent for retaining minority students in the sciences through undergraduate involvement in research as well as involvement with the Meyerhoff Scholars Program. He is also involved with adapting the Meyerhoff Scholars program at other schools with HHMI such as Penn State and UNC.
