= William Pearson (scientist) =

American biochemist

William R Pearson
- Born: William Raymond Pearson
- Education: University of Illinois at Urbana–Champaign (BS); California Institute of Technology (PhD)
- Known for: FASTA
- Awards: AAAS Fellow (2008); ISCB Fellow (2018)
- Scientific career
- Fields: Computational biology
- Institutions: University of Virginia
- Thesis: Studies on the arrangement of repeated sequences in DNA (1977)
- Website: fasta.bioch.virginia.edu/wrpearson

William Raymond Pearson is professor of biochemistry and molecular genetics in the School of Medicine at the University of Virginia. Pearson is best known for the development of the FASTA format.

== Education ==
Pearson graduated with a BS in chemistry from the University of Illinois Urbana-Champaign. He received his PhD in 1977 from Caltech. As a graduate student, he published several papers describing computer programs for analyzing biological data.

== Career and research ==
After his PhD, Pearson did a postdoctoral fellowship at Johns Hopkins University. In 1983, he joined the faculty of Biochemistry at the University of Virginia School of Medicine. Immediately after joining the faculty, he collaborated with David J. Lipman at the NIH to write the FASTP program, and later FASTA. Pearson's research interests are in computational biology. He was named an American Association for the Advancement of Science (AAAS) Fellow in 2008, and an International Society for Computational Biology (ISCB) Fellow in 2018 for outstanding contributions to the fields of computational biology and bioinformatics.
