= David J. Lipman =

American biologist

David Lipman
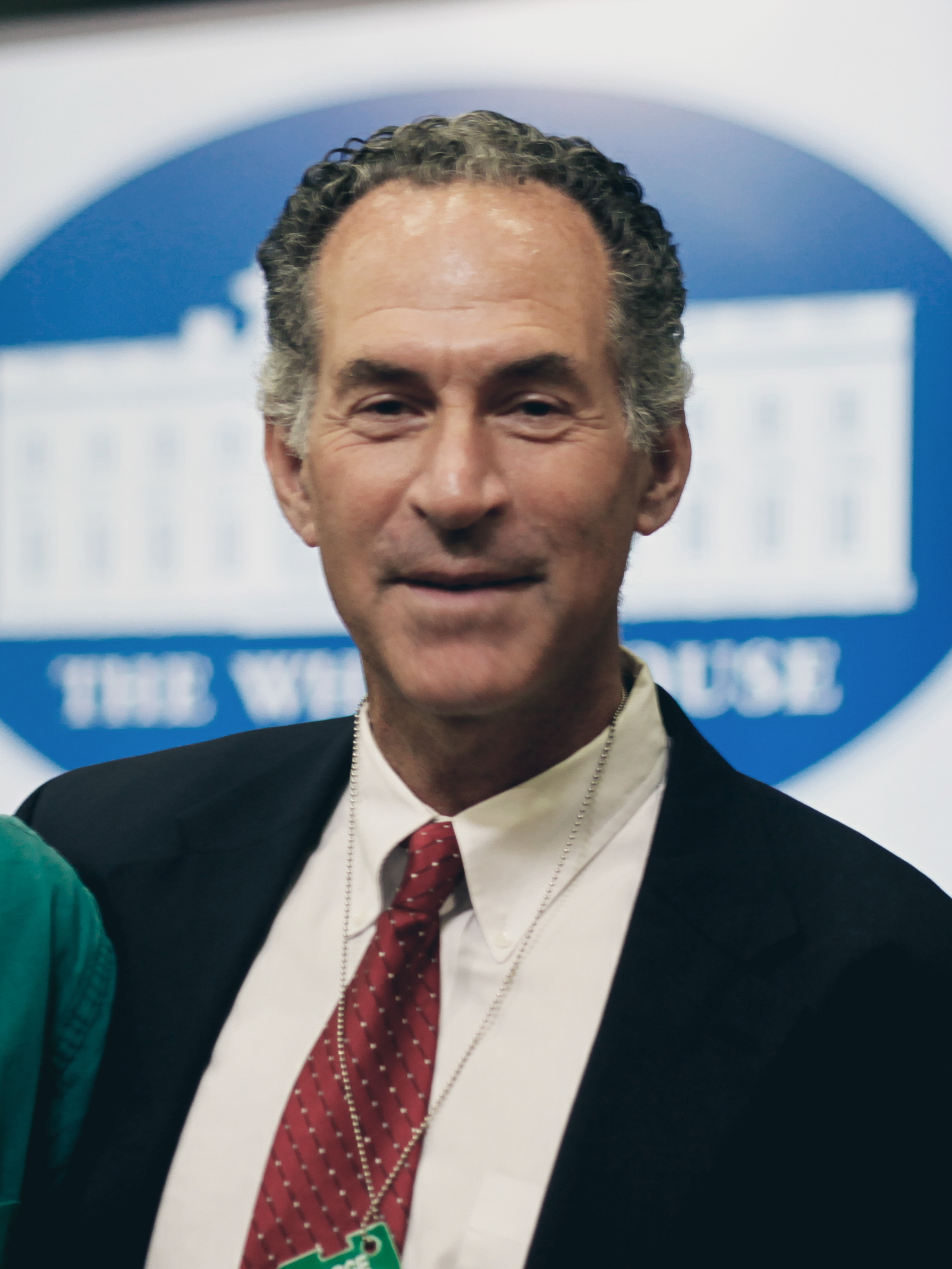
- David Lipman in June 2013
- Born: David J. Lipman
- Education: Brown University; University at Buffalo, The State University of New York
- Known for: Influence on development of BLAST (biotechnology)
- Awards: ISCB Senior Scientist Award; Member of the U.S. National Academy of Sciences; ISCB Fellow
- Scientific career
- Fields: Bioinformatics; Computational biology Sequence comparison methods Comparative genomics Molecular evolution
- Workplaces: National Center for Biotechnology Information; Brown University; University at Buffalo, The State University of New York
- Notable students: Stephen Altschul; Mark Boguski
- Website: www.ncbi.nlm.nih.gov/research/staff/lipman

David J. Lipman is an American biologist who from 1989 to 2017 was the director of the National Center for Biotechnology Information (NCBI) at the National Institutes of Health. NCBI is the home of GenBank, the U.S. node of the International Sequence Database Consortium, and PubMed, one of the most heavily used sites in the world for the search and retrieval of biomedical information. Lipman is one of the original authors of the BLAST sequence alignment program, and a respected figure in bioinformatics. In 2017, he left NCBI and became Chief Science Officer at Impossible Foods.

== Education ==
Lipman received his undergraduate degree from Brown University and his M.D. in 1980 from the University at Buffalo, The State University of New York

== Career ==
Lipman was the founding director of the National Center for Biotechnology Information, part of the National Library of Medicine at the U.S. National Institutes of Health. Under his leadership, NCBI grew from fewer than a dozen people to more than 500 scientific staff, and it now hosts hundreds of scientific and medical databases including GenBank, PubMed, PubMed Central, dbGaP, dbSNP, the Sequence Read Archive (SRA), RefSeq, PubChem, and many more. The internal research program at NCBI included groups led by Stephen Altschul (another BLAST co-author), David Landsman, Eugene Koonin (a prolific author on comparative genomics), and L. Aravind.

Lipman is very well known for his seminal work on a series of sequence similarity algorithms, starting from the Wilbur-Lipman algorithm in 1983, FASTA search in 1985, BLAST in 1990, and Gapped BLAST and PSI-BLAST in 1997. BLAST eventually became the most widely used and highly cited (over 160,000 citations as of 2021) sequence alignment program in the field, and the NCBI BLAST server today is one of its most heavily used resources.

Lipman also worked for many years with Dennis A. Benson and others at NCBI on the maintenance and improvement of GenBank, one of the world's largest databases of genome and protein sequence data. GenBank along with the European Nucleotide Archive and the DNA Data Bank of Japan form the International Nucleotide Sequence Database Collaboration (INSDC), a fully open, unrestricted database of genome sequences that has been the world's repository of such data since 1990.

He was one of the originators of the Influenza Genome Sequencing Project, a project to sequence and make available the genomes of thousands of influenza virus isolates.

He was one of the original signatories of the Bethesda Statement on Open Access Publishing.

He is also the editor-in-chief for an open-access, peer-reviewed online scientific journal called Biology Direct.

In May 2017, Lipman left his role at the NCBI to join the plant-based meat company Impossible Foods as chief scientific officer.

== Awards and honors ==
Lipman received the Association of Biomolecular Resource Facilities Award for outstanding contributions to Biomolecular Technologies in 1996.

In 2000, he was elected to the National Academy of Medicine.

In 2004, he was awarded the ISCB Senior Scientist Award and elected an ISCB Fellow in 2009 by the International Society for Computational Biology.

In 2005, Dr. Lipman was elected to the US National Academy of Sciences.

In 2013, he received the award of a White House "Open Science" Champion of Change.

In 2023, he was awarded the Warren Alpert Foundation Prize.
