= Conserved sequence =

Similar DNA, RNA or protein sequences within genomes or among species

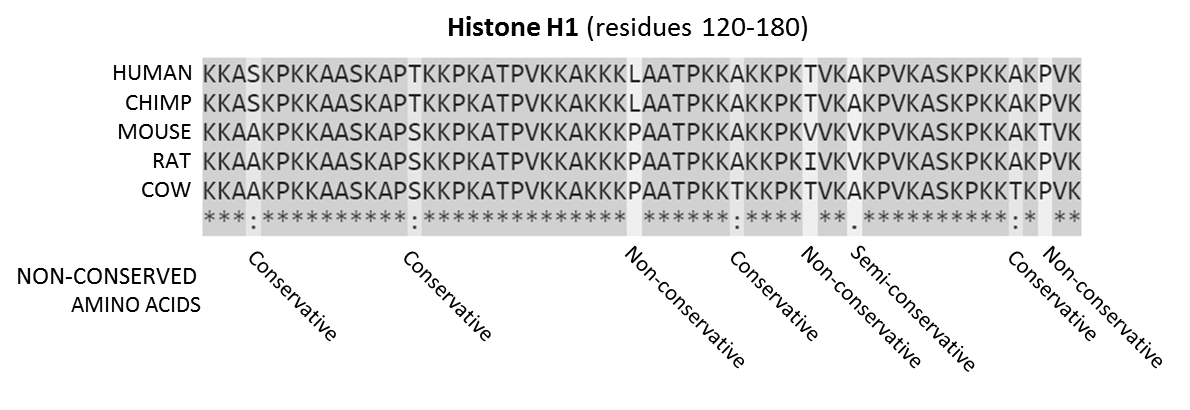
A multiple sequence alignment of five mammalian histone H1 proteins Sequences are the amino acids for residues 120-180 of the proteins. Residues that are conserved across all sequences are highlighted in grey. Below each site (i.e., position) of the protein sequence alignment is a key denoting conserved sites (*), sites with conservative replacements (:), sites with semi-conservative replacements (.), and sites with non-conservative replacements ( ).

In evolutionary biology, conserved sequences are identical or similar sequences in nucleic acids (DNA and RNA) or proteins across species (orthologous sequences), or within a genome (paralogous sequences), or between donor and receptor taxa (xenologous sequences). Conservation indicates that a sequence has been maintained by natural selection.

A highly conserved sequence is one that has remained relatively unchanged far back up the phylogenetic tree, and hence far back in geological time. Examples of highly conserved sequences include the RNA components of ribosomes present in all domains of life, the homeobox sequences widespread amongst eukaryotes, and the tmRNA in bacteria. The study of sequence conservation overlaps with the fields of genomics, proteomics, evolutionary biology, phylogenetics, bioinformatics and mathematics.

== History ==
The discovery of the role of DNA in heredity, and observations by Frederick Sanger of variation between animal insulins in 1949, prompted early molecular biologists to study taxonomy from a molecular perspective. Studies in the 1960s used DNA hybridization and protein cross-reactivity techniques to measure similarity between known orthologous proteins, such as hemoglobin and cytochrome c. In 1965, Émile Zuckerkandl and Linus Pauling introduced the concept of the molecular clock, proposing that steady rates of amino acid replacement could be used to estimate the time since two organisms diverged. While initial phylogenies closely matched the fossil record, observations that some genes appeared to evolve at different rates led to the development of theories of molecular evolution. Margaret Dayhoff's 1966 comparison of ferredoxin sequences showed that natural selection would act to conserve and optimise protein sequences essential to life.

== Mechanisms ==
Over many generations, nucleic acid sequences in the genome of an evolutionary lineage can gradually change over time due to random mutations and deletions. Sequences may also recombine or be deleted due to chromosomal rearrangements. Conserved sequences are sequences which persist in the genome despite such forces, and have slower rates of mutation than the background mutation rate.

Conservation can occur in coding and non-coding nucleic acid sequences. Highly conserved DNA sequences are thought to have functional value, although the role for many highly conserved non-coding DNA sequences is poorly understood. The extent to which a sequence is conserved can be affected by varying selection pressures, its robustness to mutation, population size and genetic drift. Many functional sequences are also modular, containing regions which may be subject to independent selection pressures, such as protein domains.

=== Coding sequence ===
In coding sequences, the nucleic acid and amino acid sequence may be conserved to different extents, as the degeneracy of the genetic code means that synonymous mutations in a coding sequence do not affect the amino acid sequence of its protein product.

Amino acid sequences can be conserved to maintain the structure or function of a protein or domain. Conserved proteins undergo fewer amino acid replacements, or are more likely to substitute amino acids with similar biochemical properties. Within a sequence, amino acids that are important for folding, structural stability, or that form a binding site may be more highly conserved.

The nucleic acid sequence of a protein coding gene may also be conserved by other selective pressures. The codon usage bias in some organisms may restrict the types of synonymous mutations in a sequence. Nucleic acid sequences that cause secondary structure in the mRNA of a coding gene may be selected against, as some structures may negatively affect translation, or conserved where the mRNA also acts as a functional non-coding RNA.

=== Non-coding ===
Non-coding sequences important for gene regulation, such as the binding or recognition sites of ribosomes and transcription factors, may be conserved within a genome. For example, the promoter of a conserved gene or operon may also be conserved. As with proteins, nucleic acids that are important for the structure and function of non-coding RNA (ncRNA) can also be conserved. However, sequence conservation in ncRNAs is generally poor compared to protein-coding sequences, and base pairs that contribute to structure or function are often conserved instead.

== Identification ==
Conserved sequences are typically identified by bioinformatics approaches based on sequence alignment. Advances in high-throughput DNA sequencing and protein mass spectrometry has substantially increased the availability of protein sequences and whole genomes for comparison since the early 2000s.

=== Homology search ===
Conserved sequences may be identified by homology search, using tools such as BLAST, HMMER, OrthologR, and Infernal. Homology search tools may take an individual nucleic acid or protein sequence as input, or use statistical models generated from multiple sequence alignments of known related sequences. Statistical models such as profile-HMMs, and RNA covariance models which also incorporate structural information, can be helpful when searching for more distantly related sequences. Input sequences are then aligned against a database of sequences from related individuals or other species. The resulting alignments are then scored based on the number of matching amino acids or bases, and the number of gaps or deletions generated by the alignment. Acceptable conservative substitutions may be identified using substitution matrices such as PAM and BLOSUM. Highly scoring alignments are assumed to be from homologous sequences. The conservation of a sequence may then be inferred by detection of highly similar homologs over a broad phylogenetic range.

=== Multiple sequence alignment ===
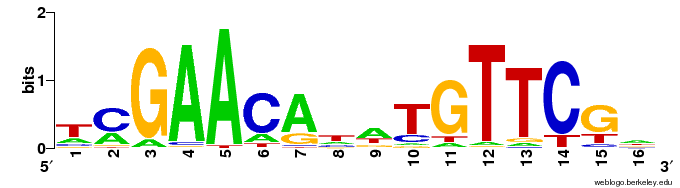
A sequence logo for the LexA-binding motif of gram-positive bacteria. As the adenosine at position 5 is highly conserved, it appears larger than other characters.

Multiple sequence alignments can be used to visualise conserved sequences. The CLUSTAL format includes a plain-text key to annotate conserved columns of the alignment, denoting conserved sequence (*), conservative mutations (:), semi-conservative mutations (.), and non-conservative mutations ( ) Sequence logos can also show conserved sequence by representing the proportions of characters at each point in the alignment by height.

=== Genome alignment ===
This image from the ECR browser shows the result of aligning different vertebrate genomes to the human genome at the conserved OTX2 gene. Top: Gene annotations of exons and introns of the OTX2 gene. For each genome, sequence similarity (%) compared to the human genome is plotted. Tracks show the zebrafish, dog, chicken, western clawed frog, opossum, mouse, rhesus macaque and chimpanzee genomes. The peaks show regions of high sequence similarity across all genomes, showing that this sequence is highly conserved.

Whole genome alignments (WGAs) may also be used to identify highly conserved regions across species. Currently the accuracy and scalability of WGA tools remains limited due to the computational complexity of dealing with rearrangements, repeat regions and the large size of many eukaryotic genomes. However, WGAs of 30 or more closely related bacteria (prokaryotes) are now increasingly feasible.

=== Scoring systems ===
Other approaches use measurements of conservation based on statistical tests that attempt to identify sequences which mutate differently to an expected background (neutral) mutation rate.

The GERP (Genomic Evolutionary Rate Profiling) framework scores conservation of genetic sequences across species. This approach estimates the rate of neutral mutation in a set of species from a multiple sequence alignment, and then identifies regions of the sequence that exhibit fewer mutations than expected. These regions are then assigned scores based on the difference between the observed mutation rate and expected background mutation rate. A high GERP score then indicates a highly conserved sequence.

LIST (Local Identity and Shared Taxa) is based on the assumption that variations observed in species closely related to human are more significant when assessing conservation compared to those in distantly related species. Thus, LIST utilizes the local alignment identity around each position to identify relevant sequences in the multiple sequence alignment (MSA) and then it estimates conservation based on the taxonomy distances of these sequences to human. Unlike other tools, LIST ignores the count/frequency of variations in the MSA.

Aminode combines multiple alignments with phylogenetic analysis to analyze changes in homologous proteins and produce a plot that indicates the local rates of evolutionary changes. This approach identifies the Evolutionarily Constrained Regions in a protein, which are segments that are subject to purifying selection and are typically critical for normal protein function.

Other approaches such as PhyloP and PhyloHMM incorporate statistical phylogenetics methods to compare probability distributions of substitution rates, which allows the detection of both conservation and accelerated mutation. First, a background probability distribution is generated of the number of substitutions expected to occur for a column in a multiple sequence alignment, based on a phylogenetic tree. The estimated evolutionary relationships between the species of interest are used to calculate the significance of any substitutions (i.e. a substitution between two closely related species may be less likely to occur than distantly related ones, and therefore more significant). To detect conservation, a probability distribution is calculated for a subset of the multiple sequence alignment, and compared to the background distribution using a statistical test such as a likelihood-ratio test or score test. P-values generated from comparing the two distributions are then used to identify conserved regions. PhyloHMM uses hidden Markov models to generate probability distributions. The PhyloP software package compares probability distributions using a likelihood-ratio test or score test, as well as using a GERP-like scoring system.

== Extreme conservation ==
=== Ultra-conserved elements ===
Ultra-conserved elements or UCEs are sequences that are highly similar or identical across multiple taxonomic groupings. These were first discovered in vertebrates, and have subsequently been identified within widely-differing taxa. While the origin and function of UCEs are poorly understood, they have been used to investigate deep-time divergences in amniotes, insects, and between animals and plants.

=== Universally conserved genes ===
The most highly conserved genes are those that can be found in all organisms. These consist mainly of the ncRNAs and proteins required for transcription and translation, which are assumed to have been conserved from the last universal common ancestor of all life.

Genes or gene families that have been found to be universally conserved include GTP-binding elongation factors, Methionine aminopeptidase 2, Serine hydroxymethyltransferase, and ATP transporters. Components of the transcription machinery, such as RNA polymerase and helicases, and of the translation machinery, such as ribosomal RNAs, tRNAs and ribosomal proteins are also universally conserved.

== Applications ==
=== Phylogenetics and taxonomy ===
Sets of conserved sequences are often used for generating phylogenetic trees, as it can be assumed that organisms with similar sequences are closely related. The choice of sequences may vary depending on the taxonomic scope of the study. For example, the most highly conserved genes such as the 16S RNA and other ribosomal sequences are useful for reconstructing deep phylogenetic relationships and identifying bacterial phyla in metagenomics studies. Sequences that are conserved within a clade but undergo some mutations, such as housekeeping genes, can be used to study species relationships. The internal transcribed spacer (ITS) region, which is required for spacing conserved rRNA genes but undergoes rapid evolution, is commonly used to classify fungi and strains of rapidly evolving bacteria.

=== Medical research ===
As highly conserved sequences often have important biological functions, they can be useful a starting point for identifying the cause of genetic diseases. Many congenital metabolic disorders and Lysosomal storage diseases are the result of changes to individual conserved genes, resulting in missing or faulty enzymes that are the underlying cause of the symptoms of the disease. Genetic diseases may be predicted by identifying sequences that are conserved between humans and lab organisms such as mice or fruit flies, and studying the effects of knock-outs of these genes. Genome-wide association studies can also be used to identify variation in conserved sequences associated with disease or health outcomes. More than two dozen novel potential susceptibility loci have been discovered for Alzehimer's disease.

=== Functional annotation ===
Identifying conserved sequences can be used to discover and predict functional sequences such as genes. Conserved sequences with a known function, such as protein domains, can also be used to predict the function of a sequence. Databases of conserved protein domains such as Pfam and the Conserved Domain Database can be used to annotate functional domains in predicted protein coding genes.

== See also ==
- Evolutionary developmental biology
- NAPP (database)
- Segregating site
- Sequence alignment
- Sequence alignment software
- UCbase
