= Samuel Wendell Williston =

American paleontologist (1852–1918)

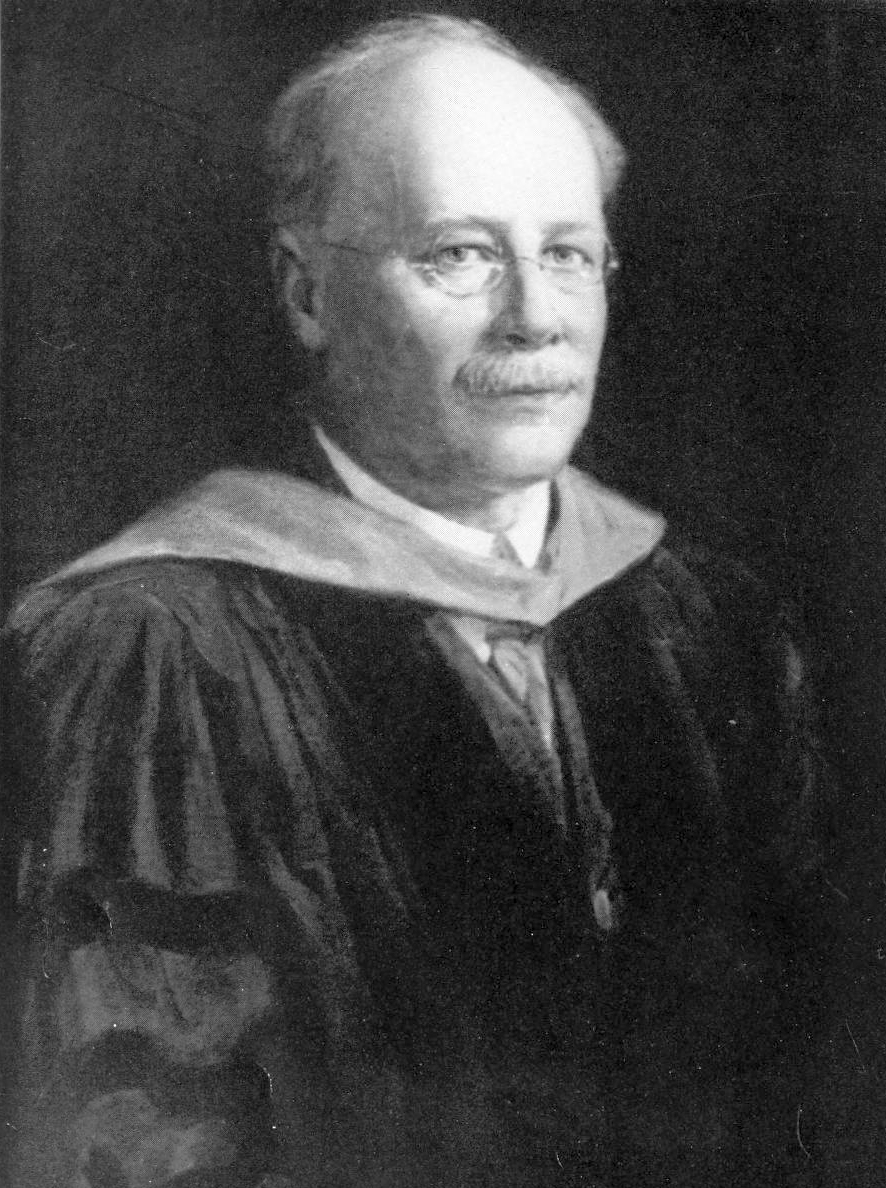
- Born: July 10, 1852; Boston, Massachusetts, United States
- Died: August 30, 1918 (aged 66); Chicago, Illinois, United States
- Education: Kansas State Agricultural College; Yale University
- Known for: Allosaurus, Diplodocus, illustrations, terrestrial origin of bird flight
- Scientific career
- Fields: Paleontology
- Workplaces: Yale University; University of Kansas; University of Chicago
- Doctoral students: Maurice Mehl

Samuel Wendell Williston (July 10, 1852 – August 30, 1918) was an American educator, entomologist, and paleontologist who was the first to propose that birds developed flight cursorially (by running), rather than arboreally (by leaping from tree to tree). He was a specialist on the flies, Diptera.

He is remembered for Williston's law, which states that parts in an organism, such as arthropod limbs, become reduced in number and specialized in function through evolutionary history.

== Early life ==
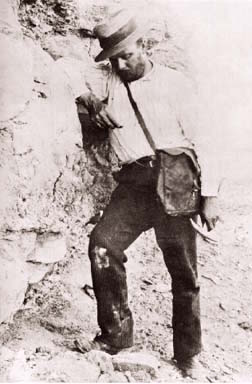
Williston in 1891

Williston was born in Boston, Massachusetts to Samuel Williston and Jane A. Williston née Turner. As a young child, Williston's family travelled to Kansas Territory in 1857 under the auspices of the New England Emigrant Aid Company to help fight the extension of slavery. He was raised in Manhattan, Kansas, attended public high school there, and graduated from Kansas State Agricultural College (now Kansas State University) in 1872, afterwards receiving a Master of Arts from that institution.

In 1874, he went on his first field fossil hunting expedition for Othniel Charles Marsh at Yale University under the mentorship of Benjamin Franklin Mudge, and led his first expedition in 1877. With Mudge, Williston discovered the first fossils of the dinosaurs Allosaurus and Diplodocus. He was noted for painstakingly illustrating the finds. In 1880, he matriculated to Yale University, for several years was a post-graduate student and faculty member. Around this time, he proposed the first explicit model for the terrestrial origin of bird flight (i.e., that dinosaurs developed flight by running along the ground rather than jumping from trees).

Williston returned to Kansas in 1890, to take a position on the faculty at the University of Kansas as a professor of geology and anatomy. In 1899, he was named the first Dean of the new School of Medicine there. He was also a member of the state boards of health and medical examiners. In 1902, Williston left Kansas again, and took the chair of paleontology at the University of Chicago.

Williston was a fellow of the Geological Society of America, a foreign correspondent for the London Geological and Zoölogical societies, a member of the United States National Academy of Sciences, a member of the American Academy of Arts and Sciences, and a member of the American Philosophical Society. He was president of the Kansas Academy of Science, and in 1903 became president of the Society of Vertebrate Paleontology. He was the author of several books, and the Smithsonian Institution now administers an endowment fund in his name.

== Work on Diptera ==
Although never employed as a professional entomologist, Samuel W. Williston was a Fellow of the Entomological Society of America since 1915, and was well-renowned specialist on the taxonomy and systematics of flies (Diptera). He became the first North American specialist on this group, publishing over 50 books and papers, and naming more than 1250 species. His best-known works were the three editions of the Manual of North American Diptera (1888, 1896, 1908).

== The Osteology of the Reptiles ==
In 1925, Williston published (post hum?) a comprehensive survey of the reptilian skeleton, which was a precursor to the monumental Osteology of Reptiles by A. S. Romer.

== Williston's law ==
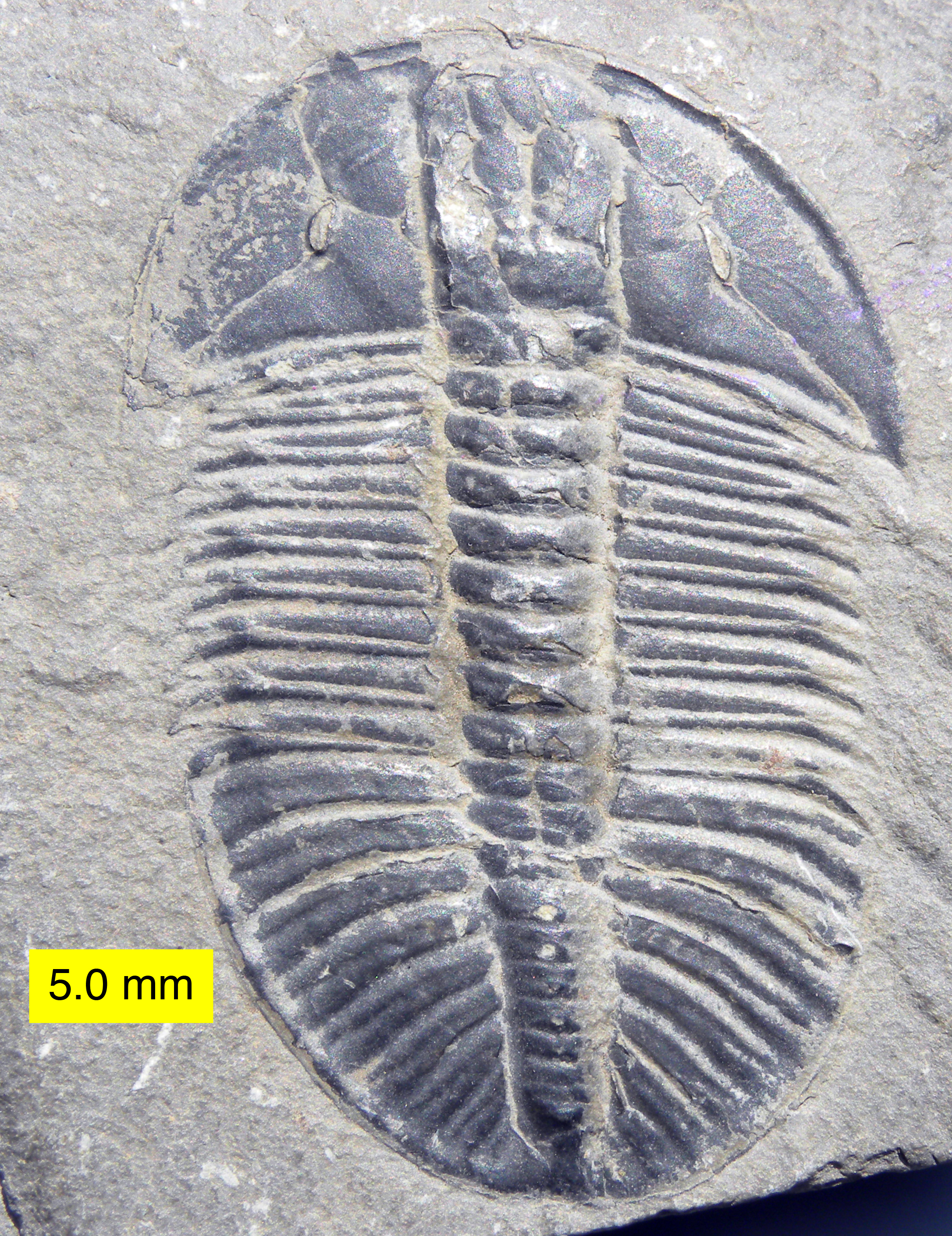
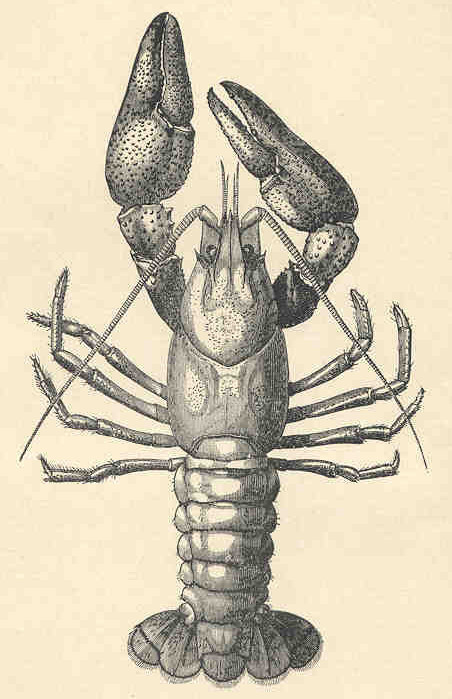
Williston's law states that in lineages such as the arthropods, limbs tend to become fewer and more specialised, as shown by the crayfish (right), whereas its trilobite ancestors had many similar legs.

Williston noticed that, over evolutionary time, the modular and serially repeated parts distinguishing animal groups exhibited trends in numbers and types. For instance, ancient vertebrates were characterized by mouths that contained mostly similar teeth, whereas recent vertebrates are characterized by mouths with different kinds of teeth, adapted for biting, tearing, and compacting food; differences ultimately characterized different diets, with carnivores bearing incisors, canines and carnassials, and grazers bearing mostly molars. In 1914, Williston declared that "it is also a law in evolution that the parts in an organism tend toward reduction in number, with the fewer parts greatly specialized in function". However, empirical studies have not always confirmed this generalization. For instance, a study of the evolution in the number of branchiostegal rays in osteichthyans has failed to support a generalized trend towards reduction. Instead, this series of elements shows an early burst pattern (rapid evolution early in the history of the group, followed by a decrease in evolutionary rate).
