= Phenotypic integration =

Phenotypic integration is a metric for measuring the correlation of multiple functionally-related traits to each other. Complex phenotypes often require multiple traits working together in order to function properly. Phenotypic integration is significant because it provides an explanation as to how phenotypes are sustained by relationships between traits. Every organism's phenotype is integrated, organized, and a functional whole. Integration is also associated with functional modules. Modules are complex character units that are tightly associated, such as a flower. It is hypothesized that organisms with high correlations between traits in a module have the most efficient functions. The fitness of a particular value for one phenotypic trait frequently depends on the value of the other phenotypic traits, making it important for those traits evolve together. One trait can have a direct effect on fitness, and it has been shown that the correlations among traits can also change fitness, causing these correlations to be adaptive, rather than solely genetic. Integration can be involved in multiple aspects of life, not just at the genetic level, but during development, or simply at a functional level.

Integration can be caused by genetic, developmental, environmental, or physiological relationships among characters. Environmental conditions can alter or cause integration, i.e. they may be plastic. Correlational selection, a form of natural selection, can also produce integration. At the genetic level, integration can be caused by pleiotropy, close linkage, or linkage disequilibrium among unlinked genes. At the developmental level it can be due to cell-cell signaling such as in the development of the ectopic eyes in Drosophila. It is believed that the patterns of genetic covariance helped distinguish certain species. It can create variation among certain phenotypes, and can facilitate efficiency. This is significant because integration may play a huge role in phenotypic evolution. Phenotypic integration and its evolution can not only create large amounts of variety among phenotypes which can cause variation among species. For example, the color patterns on Garter snakes range widely and are caused by the covariance among multiple phenotypes.

Phenotypic Integration is important for many traits. One specifically is the development of fewer bones in the neurocranium.

== Origins ==
Shortly after the structure of DNA was uncovered, Everett C. Olson and Robert L. Miller (1958) wrote the first book regarding the topic of phenotypic integration. The term integration was first used in reference to genetics by Olson and Miller, referring to correlations among characters that are influenced by selection. Following Olson and Miller, botanical studies on coherence between characters were done spanning over many years. Its first expansion was in the construction of a morphological integration genetic model constructed by Russell Lande (1980). However, the term "Phenotypic Integration" was first coined by Massimo Pigliucci and Katherine Preston, in their book, Phenotypic Integration, which helped elucidate the observed laws of correlation and some theoretical issues regarding the topic.

== Natural Selection and Phenotypic Integration ==
Phenotypic Integration can be favorable or unfavorable with respect to natural selection. It has been shown that certain combinations of correlated traits can be unfavorable to an organism. In an ontogenetic study of laboratory rats, certain covariances among developmental characters which produced differing functions in the skull and limb were less favorable than another set that contributed to skull and limb structure. The most common form of selection on phenotypic integration is correlational selection. Correlational selection is a form of natural selection that favors certain combinations of traits (phenotypic integration). It can promote both genetic correlations and high levels of genetic variation. It has even been found that correlational selection may be the most common form of natural selection. Occasionally, this form of selection will favor a group of traits at the expense of others and if it does favor a particular set of traits it will include the most used traits whose functional effectiveness is essential for their ability to work together, and whose successful interaction is needed for the fitness of the individual. Phenotypic integration may be the adaptive product of correlational selection. An example of natural selection favoring integration is in the color patterns and escape mechanisms of the Garter snake, Thamnophis Ordinoides. Another example is in plants that have highly-specific pollinators, natural selection favors plants that have highly specialized flowering to pair with the specific pollinators, and therefore high floral integration.

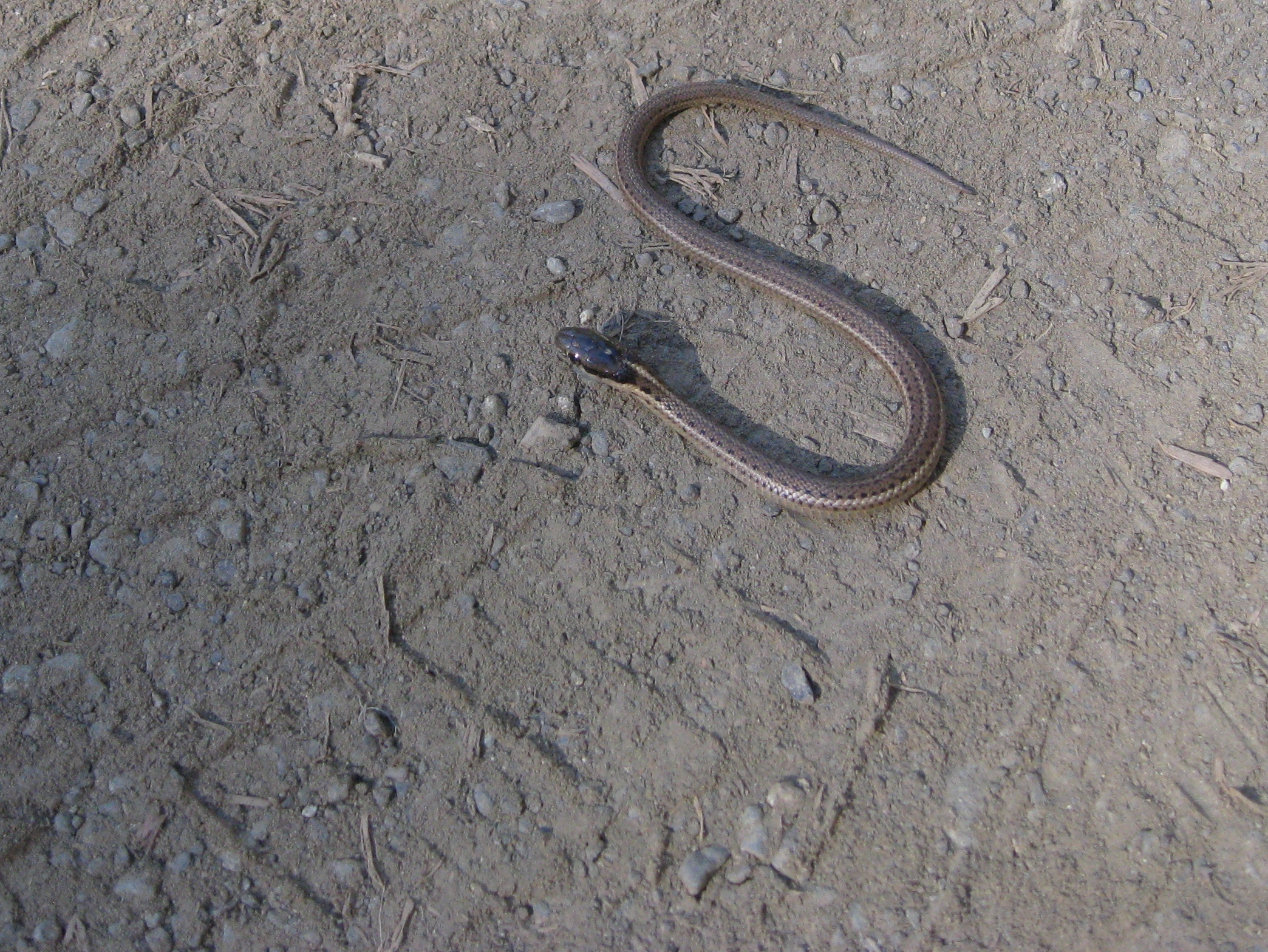
Northwestern Garter Snake's color patterns and escape mechanisms are integrated.

== Evolution of Phenotypic Integration ==
Integration can be found at the genetic level due to genetic linkage. Genetic linkage involves multiple genes being inherited together during meiosis because they are close to each other on the same chromosome. Alleles at different loci can be inherited together if they are tightly linked. Large genetic correlations can only be upheld if the loci that influence different characters are tightly linked, or if high levels of inbreeding in the population occur. Even if selection favors the correlations, it will not be maintained unless those conditions are met. Selection will favor tight linkage because it is maintained better. Poorly linked genetic correlations will not last. Transposition allows the loci at different locations on the chromosome to move so that they can become close to each other and be inherited together. This is significant to understanding the relationship between phenotypic integration and evolution because it is one of the mechanisms of how multiple traits that are connected to each other to evolve and change together. For instance, the Papilio dardanus butterflies come in three different forms, each mimicking a different distasteful butterfly species. Multiple loci contribute to these different forms, and a butterfly with alleles for form A at one locus and B at another locus would have poor fitness. However, the multiple loci are tightly linked, so they are inherited together as a single allele. Through transposition, these multiple loci ended up close to each other.

Mutations among these linked genes are the nonadaptive fuel which can create evolution. Evolution may also occur because the integration may have an adaptive advantage in a particular environment for an organism. It is also important to recognize that not only can the traits be inherited together, but inherited separately and selected together. Another important example of phenotypic integration evolving over time is the relationship between the neurocranium and the brain. Over the last 150 million years the number of bones in the brain has decreased while the size of the brain in mammals has changed. Integration between the brain and the skull has evolved over this time period to reduce the number of bones in the cranium, while increasing the size of the brain. This relationship between correlated traits has played an important role in the evolution of mammalian cranium structure and brain size. Finally, development is another crucial cause of phenotypic integration that has evolved over time. Cell-signaling pathways which utilize integration in the form of complex interactions among specific cells in the pathway are crucial to proper development in many organisms. The interactions among the cells in the pathway, and the interaction of the pathways with other pathways have evolved over time to create complex structures.

== Examples ==
Aposematism in poison dart frogs has also shown that phenotypic integration may be involved. Aposematism is the use of warning colors to deter predators because it often conveys the organism being poisonous, and this study found that diet specialization, and chemical defense are integrated and help affect aposematism.

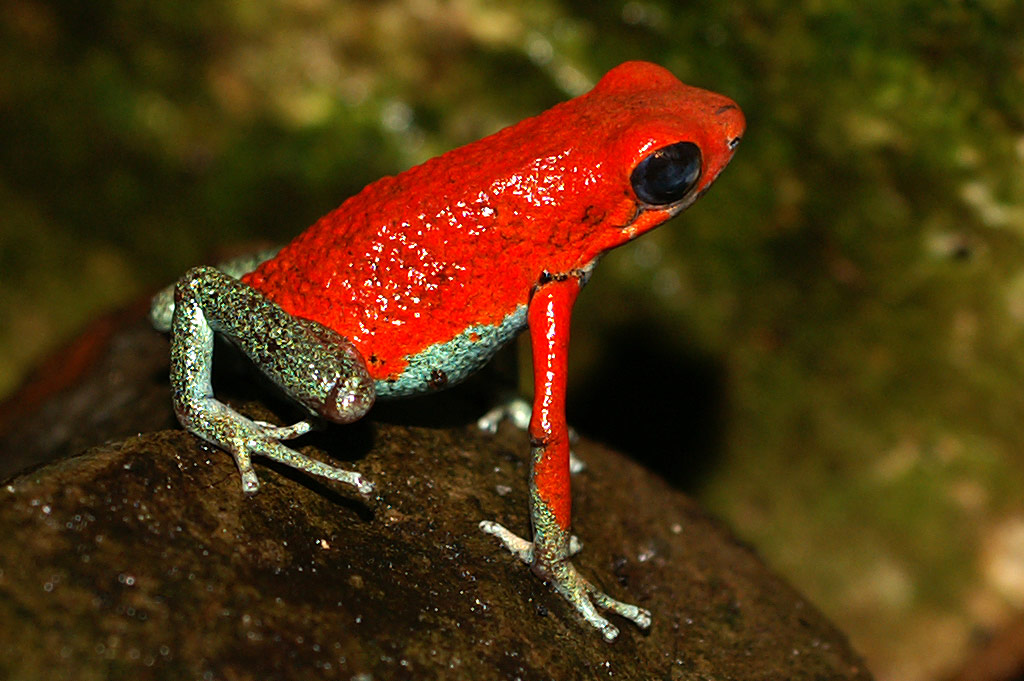
The Poison Dart Frog is an example of a species that illustrates phenotypic integration.

In another study regarding the relationship of sexual ornaments and phenotypic integration, there seems to be a paradox where sexual traits are expected to be both less integrated for greater expression, and more integrated to better indicate physiological quality. However, in the case of the house finch, the female house finches select for males based on their likelihood to be a good parent. The females base their choice of male parental behaviors on the elaboration of the male's sexual ornamentation. Thus, female choice favors hormonally controlled integration of male sexual behaviors and male sexual ornamentation.

Phylogenetically consistent patterns of phenotypic integration have also been recently reported in leaves, floral morphology, and dry fruits as well as in the morphology of some animal organs.

The concept of morphological integration was tested in the evolution of bird limbs; strong integration between the forelimbs and hindlimbs across Maniraptora is consistent with a developmental hypothesis emphasizing the influence of serial homology and shared developmental programs. The research also highlighted that stronger and weaker patterns of morphological integration can occur simultaneously, showing that the overall Maniraptora lineage follows a broad integrated trend, while distinct evolutionary grades within it (e.g., enantiornithes, neoaves) exhibit weaker, group-specific covariation patterns. These findings underscore that the degree of morphological integration is scale-dependent and can reflect underlying developmental constraints even amidst significant functional diversification.

== Future work ==
Understanding phenotypic integration will continue as more research and understanding is done with regards to genetic, developmental, and physiological mechanisms, and learn more about the relationship of selection and complex phenotypes. Research of this topic can even be beneficial to modern biomedicine.
