= NAPP (database) =

NAPP:

Content
- Description: Nucleic Acid Phylogenetic Profile Database.

Contact
- Research center: Université Paris Sud
- Laboratory: Institut de Génétique et Microbiologie.
- Authors: Alban Ott
- Primary citation: Ott & al. (2012)
- Release date: 2011

Access
- Website: http://napp.u-psud.fr/

The Nucleic acid phylogenetic profiling (NAPP) is a database of coding and non-coding sequences according to their pattern of conservation across the other genomes.

== See also ==
- Conserved sequence
