= UCbase =

UCbase 2.0

Content
- Description: ultraconserved sequences database.
- Organisms: Homo sapiens Mus musculus Rattus norvegicus

Contact
- Research center: The Ohio State University
- Laboratory: Professor Carlo M. Croce, MD
- Authors: Professor Cristian Taccioli, Ph.D
- Primary citation: Taccioli, C. et al. (2014)
- Release date: 2014

Access
- Website: http://ucbase.unimore.it

Miscellaneous
- Data release frequency: 6 months

UCbase is a database of ultraconserved sequences (UCRs or UCEs) that were first described by Bejerano, G. et al. in 2004. They are highly conserved genome regions that share 100% identity among human, mouse and rat. UCRs are 481 sequences longer than 200 bases. They are frequently located at genomic regions involved in cancer, differentially expressed in human leukemias and carcinomas and in some instances regulated by microRNAs.

The first release of UCbase was published by Taccioli, C. et al. in 2009. Recent updates include new annotation based on hg19 Human genome, information about disorders related to the chromosome coordinates using the SNOMED CT classification, a query tool to search for SNPs, and a new text box to directly interrogate the database using a MySQL interface. Moreover, a sequence comparison tool allows the researchers to match selected sequences against ultraconserved elements located in genomic regions involved in specific disorders.

To facilitate the interactive, visual interpretation of UCR chromosomal coordinates, the authors have implemented the graph visualization feature of UCbase creating a link to the UCSC Genome Browser. UCbase 2.0 does not provide microRNAs (miRNAs) information anymore focusing only on UCRs. The official release of UCbase 2.0 was published in 2014.

== See also ==
- Sequence conservation
