= Segregating site =

Segregating sites are positions which show differences (polymorphisms) between related genes in a sequence alignment (are not conserved). Segregating sites include conservative, semi-conservative and non-conservative mutations.

The proportion of segregating sites within a gene is an important statistic in population genetics since it can be used to estimate mutation rate assuming no selection. For example, it is used to calculate the Tajima's D neutral evolution statistic.

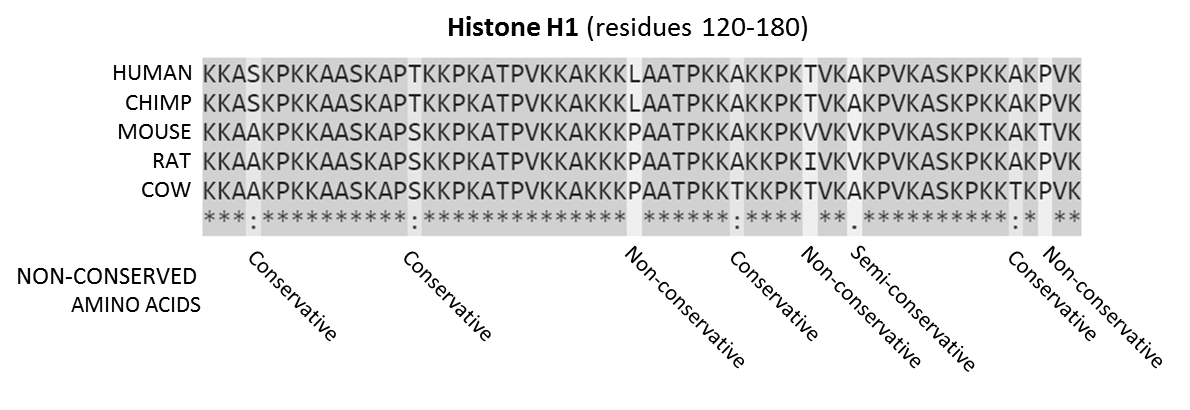
A sequence alignment, produced by ClustalO, of mammalian histone proteins. Sequences are the amino acids for residues 120-180 of the proteins. Residues that are conserved across all sequences are highlighted in grey. Below the protein sequences is a key denoting conserved sequence (*), conservative mutations (:), semi-conservative mutations (.), and non-conservative mutations ( ).

== See also ==
- Conserved sequence
- Ultra-conserved element
- Sequence alignment
- Sequence alignment software
- ClustalW
