= Conservative replacement =

Exchange between similar amino acids of a protein

A conservative replacement (also called a conservative mutation or a conservative substitution or a homologous replacement) is an amino acid replacement in a protein that changes a given amino acid to a different amino acid with similar biochemical properties (e.g. charge, hydrophobicity and size).

Conversely, a radical replacement, or radical substitution, is an amino acid replacement that exchanges an initial amino acid by a final amino acid with different physicochemical properties.

== Description ==
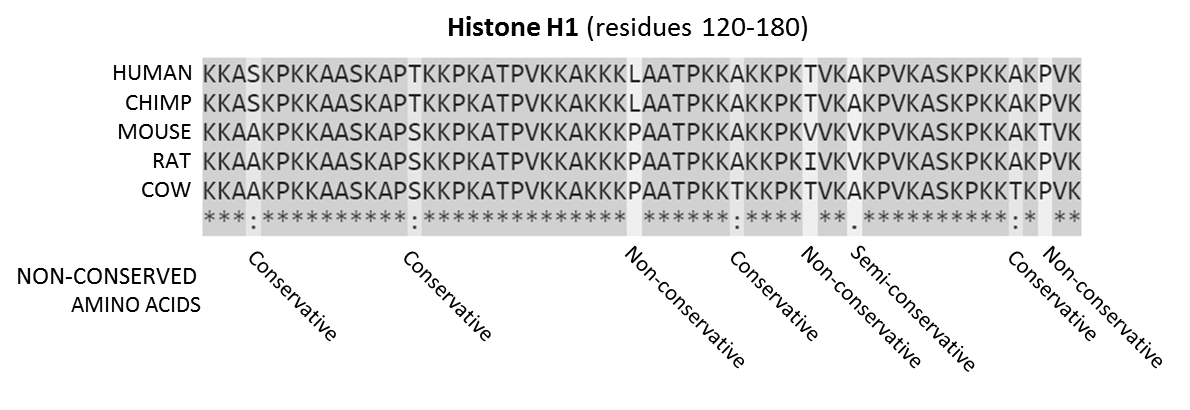
A multiple sequence alignment, produced by ClustalO, of five mammalian histone H1 proteins. Sequences are the amino acids for residues 120-180 of the proteins. Residues that are conserved across all sequences are highlighted in grey. Below each site (i.e., position) of the protein sequence alignment is a key denoting conserved sites (*), sites with conservative replacements (:), sites with semi-conservative replacements (.), and sites with non-conservative replacements ( ). This key uses PAM250 as a similarity measure.

There are 20 naturally occurring amino acids, however some of these share similar characteristics. For example, leucine and isoleucine are both aliphatic, branched hydrophobes. Similarly, aspartic acid and glutamic acid are both small, negatively charged residues.

Although there are many ways to classify amino acids, they are often sorted into six main classes on the basis of their structure and the general chemical characteristics of their side chains (R groups).

Class	Amino acids	1-letter code
Aliphatic	Glycine, Alanine, Valine, Leucine, Isoleucine	G, A, V, L, I
Hydroxyl or sulfur/selenium-containing	Serine, Cysteine, Selenocysteine, Threonine, Methionine	S, C, U, T, M
Cyclic	Proline	P
Aromatic	Phenylalanine, Tyrosine, Tryptophan	F, Y, W
Basic	Histidine, Lysine, Arginine	H, K, R
Acidic and their amides	Aspartate, Glutamate, Asparagine, Glutamine	D, E, N, Q

Physicochemical distances aim at quantifying the intra-class and inter-class dissimilarity between amino acids based on their measurable properties, and many such measures have been proposed in the literature. Owing to their simplicity, two of the most commonly used measures are the ones of Grantham (1974) and Miyata et al (1979). A conservative replacement is therefore an exchange between two amino acids separated by a small physicochemical distance. Conversely, a radical replacement is an exchange between two amino acids separated by a large physicochemical distance.

== Impact on function ==
Conservative replacements in proteins often have a better effect on function than non-conservative replacements. The reduced effect of conservative replacements on function can also be seen in the occurrence of different replacements in nature. Non-conservative replacements between proteins are far more likely to be removed by natural selection due to their deleterious effects.

== See also ==
- Segregating site
- Ultra-conserved element
- Sequence alignment
- Sequence alignment software
