= Amino acid replacement =

Exchange between amino acids of a protein

Amino acid replacement is a change from one amino acid to a different amino acid in a protein due to point mutation in the corresponding DNA sequence. It is caused by a nonsynonymous missense mutation which changes the codon sequence to code for a different amino acid than the original sequence.

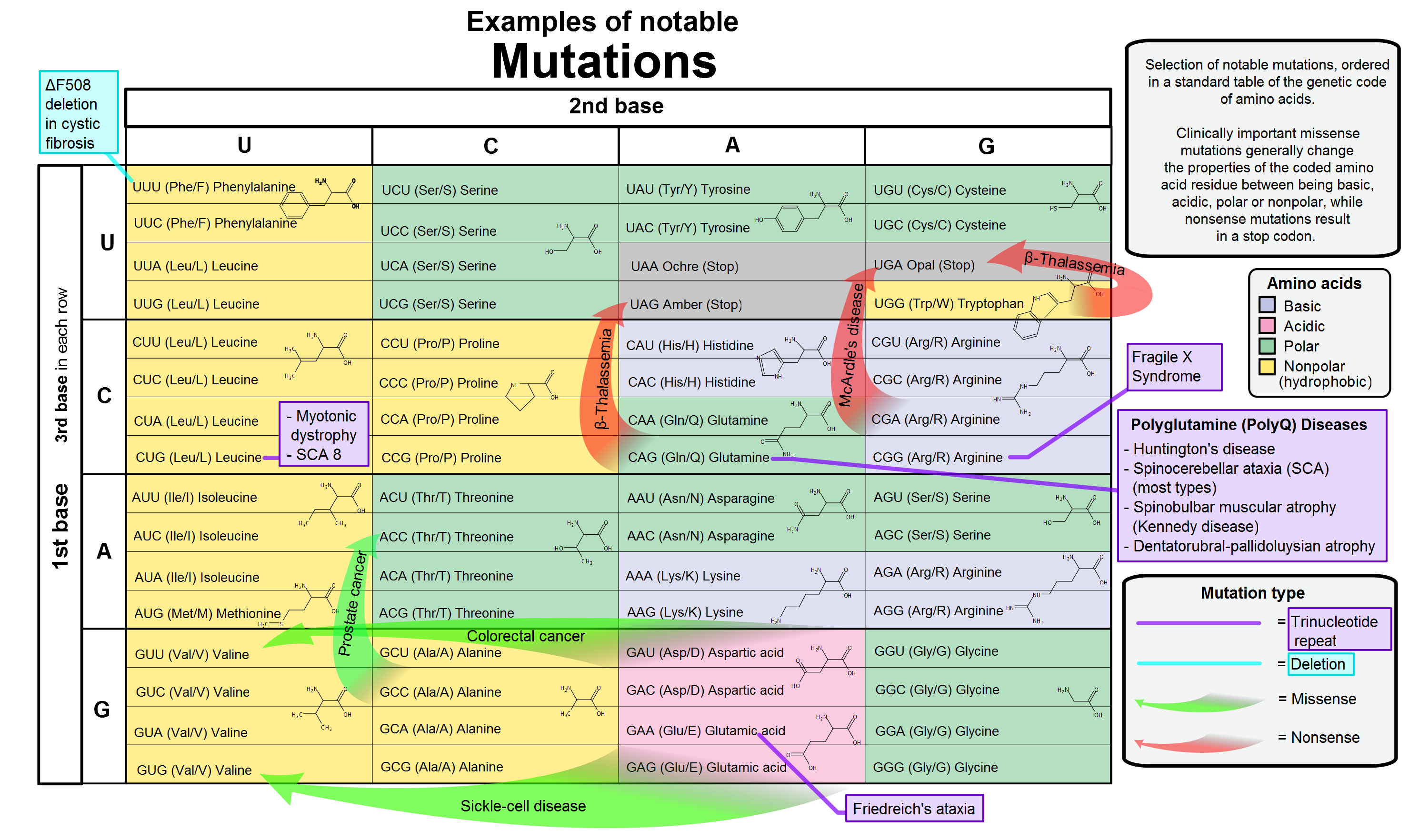
Notable mutations

== Conservative and radical replacements ==
Not all amino acid replacements have the same effect on function or structure of protein. The magnitude of this process may vary depending on how similar or dissimilar the replaced amino acids are, as well as on their position in the sequence or the structure. Similarity between amino acids can be calculated based on substitution matrices, physico-chemical distance, or simple properties such as amino acid size or charge (see also amino acid chemical properties). Usually amino acids are thus classified into two types:

- Conservative replacement - an amino acid is exchanged into another that has similar properties. This type of replacement is expected to rarely result in dysfunction in the corresponding protein.
- Radical replacement - an amino acid is exchanged into another with different properties. This can lead to changes in protein structure or function, which can cause potentially lead to changes in phenotype, sometimes pathogenic. A well known example in humans is sickle cell anemia, due to a mutation in beta globin where at position 6 glutamic acid (negatively charged) is exchanged with valine (not charged).

== Physicochemical distances ==
Physicochemical distance is a measure that assesses the difference between replaced amino acids. The value of distance is based on properties of amino acids. There are 134 physicochemical properties that can be used to estimate similarity between amino acids. Each physicochemical distance is based on different composition of properties.

Properties of amino acids employed for estimating overall similarity
Two-state characters	Properties
1-5	Presence respectively of: β―CH_{2}, γ―CH_{2}, δ―CH_{2} (proline scored as positive), ε―CH_{2} group and a―CH_{3} group
6-10	Presence respectively of: ω―SH, ω―COOH, ω―NH_{2} (basic), ω―CONH_{2} and ―CHOH groups
11-15	Presence respectively of: benzene ring (including tryptophan as positive), branching in side chain by a CH group, a second CH_{3} group, two but not three ―H groups at the ends of the side chain (proline scored as positive) and a C―S―C group
16-20	Presence respectively of: guanido group, α―NH_{2}, α―NH group in ring, δ―NH group in ring, ―N= group in ring
21-25	Presence respectively of: ―CH=N, indolyl group, imidazole group, C=O group in side chain, and configuration at α―C potentially changing direction of the peptide chain (only proline scores positive)
26-30	Presence respectively of: sulphur atom, primary aliphatic ―OH group, secondary aliphatic ―OH group, phenolic ―OH group, ability to form S―S bridges
31-35	Presence respectively of: imidazole ―NH group, indolyl ―NH group, ―SCH_{3} group, a second optical centre, the N=CR―NH group
36-40	Presence respectively of: isopropyl group, distinct aromatic reactivity, strong aromatic reactivity, terminal positive charge, negative charge at high pH (tyrosine scored positive)
41	Presence of pyrrolidine ring
42-53	Molecular weight (approximate) of side chain, scored in 12 additive steps (sulphur counted as the equivalent of two carbon, nitrogen or oxygen atoms)
54-56	Presence, respectively, of: flat 5-, 6- and 9-membered ring system
57-64	pK at isoelectric point, scored additively in steps of 1 pH
65-68	Logarithm of solubility in water of the ʟ-isomer in mg/100 ml., scored additively
69-70	Optical rotation in 5 ɴ-HCl, [α]_{D} 0 to -25, and over -25, respectively
71-72	Optical rotation in 5 ɴ-HCI, [α] 0 to +25, respectively (values for glutamine and tryptophan with water as solvent, and for asparagine 3·4 ɴ-HCl)
73-74	Side-chain hydrogen bonding (ionic type), strong donor and strong acceptor, respectively
75-76	Side-chain hydrogen bonding (neutral type), strong donor and strong acceptor, respectively
77-78	Water structure former, respectively moderate and strong
79	Water structure breaker
80-82	Mobile electrons few, moderate and many, respectively (scored additively)
83-85	Heat and age stability moderate, high and very high, respectively (scored additively)
86-89	R_{F} in phenol-water paper chromatography in steps of 0·2 (scored additively)
90-93	R_{F} in toluene-pyridine-glycolchlorhydrin (paper chromatography of DNP-derivative) in steps of 0·2 (scored additively: for lysine the di-DNP derivative)
94-97	Ninhydrin colour after collidine-lutidine chromatography and heating 5 min at 100 °C, respectively purple, pink, brown and yellow
98	End of side-chain furcated
99-101	Number of substituents on the β-carbon atom, respectively 1, 2 or 3 (scored additively)
102-111	The mean number of lone pair electrons on the side-chain (scored additively)
112-115	Number of bonds in the side-chain allowing rotation (scored additively)
116-117	Ionic volume within rings slight, or moderate (scored additively)
118-124	Maximum moment of inertia for rotation at the α―β bond (scored additively in seven approximate steps)
125-131	Maximum moment of inertia for rotation at the β―γ bond (scored additively in seven approximate steps)
132-134	Maximum moment of inertia for rotation at the γ―δ bond (scored additively in three approximate steps)

=== Grantham's distance ===
Grantham's distance depends on three properties: composition, polarity and molecular volume.

Distance difference D for each pair of amino acid i and j is calculated as: $D_{ij}=[\alpha(c_i-c_j)^2+\beta(p_i-p_j)^2+\gamma(v_i-v_j)^2]^{\frac{1}{2}}$

where c = composition, p = polarity, and v = molecular volume; and are constants of squares of the inverses of the mean distance for each property, respectively equal to 1.833, 0.1018, 0.000399. According to Grantham's distance, most similar amino acids are leucine and isoleucine and the most distant are cysteine and tryptophan.

Difference D for amino acids
Arg	Leu	Pro	Thr	Ala	Val	Gly	Ile	Phe	Tyr	Cys	His	Gln	Asn	Lys	Asp	Glu	Met	Trp	
110	145	74	58	99	124	56	142	155	144	112	89	68	46	121	65	80	135	177	Ser
	102	103	71	112	96	125	97	97	77	180	29	43	86	26	96	54	91	101	Arg
		98	92	96	32	138	5	22	36	198	99	113	153	107	172	138	15	61	Leu
			38	27	68	42	95	114	110	169	77	76	91	103	108	93	87	147	Pro
				58	69	59	89	103	92	149	47	42	65	78	85	65	81	128	Thr
					64	60	94	113	112	195	86	91	111	106	126	107	84	148	Ala
						109	29	50	55	192	84	96	133	97	152	121	21	88	Val
							135	153	147	159	98	87	80	127	94	98	127	184	Gly
								21	33	198	94	109	149	102	168	134	10	61	Ile
									22	205	100	116	158	102	177	140	28	40	Phe
										194	83	99	143	85	160	122	36	37	Tyr
											174	154	139	202	154	170	196	215	Cys
												24	68	32	81	40	87	115	His
													46	53	61	29	101	130	Gln
														94	23	42	142	174	Asn
															101	56	95	110	Lys
																45	160	181	Asp
																	126	152	Glu
																		67	Met

=== Sneath's index ===
Sneath's index takes into account 134 categories of activity and structure. Dissimilarity index D is a percentage value of the sum of all properties not shared between two replaced amino acids. It is percentage value expressed by $D=1-S$, where S is Similarity.

Dissimilarity D between amino acids
	Leu	Ile	Val	Gly	Ala	Pro	Gln	Asn	Met	Thr	Ser	Cys	Glu	Asp	Lys	Arg	Tyr	Phe	Trp
Ile	5																		
Val	9	7																	
Gly	24	25	19																
Ala	15	17	12	9															
Pro	23	24	20	17	16														
Gln	22	24	25	32	26	33													
Asn	20	23	23	26	25	31	10												
Met	20	22	23	34	25	31	13	21											
Thr	23	21	17	20	20	25	24	19	25										
Ser	23	25	20	19	16	24	21	15	22	12									
Cys	24	26	21	21	13	25	22	19	17	19	13								
Glu	30	31	31	37	34	43	14	19	26	34	29	33							
Asp	25	28	28	33	30	40	22	14	31	29	25	28	7						
Lys	23	24	26	31	26	31	21	27	24	34	31	32	26	34					
Arg	33	34	36	43	37	43	23	31	28	38	37	36	31	39	14				
Tyr	30	34	36	36	34	37	29	28	32	32	29	34	34	34	34	36			
Phe	19	22	26	29	26	27	24	24	24	28	25	29	35	35	28	34	13		
Trp	30	34	37	39	36	37	31	32	31	38	35	37	43	45	34	36	21	13	
His	25	28	31	34	29	36	27	24	30	34	28	31	27	35	27	31	23	18	25

=== Epstein's coefficient of difference ===
Epstein's coefficient of difference is based on the differences in polarity and size between replaced pairs of amino acids. This index that distincts the direction of exchange between amino acids, described by 2 equations:

$\Delta_{a\rightarrow b}=(\delta_{polarity}^2+\delta_{size}^2)^{1/2}$ when smaller hydrophobic residue is replaced by larger hydrophobic or polar residue

$\Delta_{a\rightarrow b}=(\delta_{polarity}^2+[0.5 \delta_{size}]^2)^{1/2}$when polar residue is exchanged or larger residue is replaced by smaller

Coefficient of difference $(\Delta_{a\rightarrow b})$
	Phe	Met	Leu	Ile	Val	Pro	Tyr	Trp	Cys	Ala	Gly	Ser	Thr	His	Glu	Gln	Asp	Asn	Lys	Arg
Phe		0.05	0.08	0.08	0.1	0.1	0.21	0.25	0.22	0.43	0.53	0.81	0.81	0.8	1	1	1	1	1	1
Met	0.1		0.03	0.03	0.1	0.1	0.25	0.32	0.21	0.41	0.42	0.8	0.8	0.8	1	1	1	1	1	1
Leu	0.15	0.05		0	0.03	0.03	0.28	0.36	0.2	0.43	0.51	0.8	0.8	0.81	1	1	1	1	1	1.01
Ile	0.15	0.05	0		0.03	0.03	0.28	0.36	0.2	0.43	0.51	0.8	0.8	0.81	1	1	1	1	1	1.01
Val	0.2	0.1	0.05	0.05		0	0.32	0.4	0.2	0.4	0.5	0.8	0.8	0.81	1	1	1	1	1	1.02
Pro	0.2	0.1	0.05	0.05	0		0.32	0.4	0.2	0.4	0.5	0.8	0.8	0.81	1	1	1	1	1	1.02
Tyr	0.2	0.22	0.22	0.22	0.24	0.24		0.1	0.13	0.27	0.36	0.62	0.61	0.6	0.8	0.8	0.81	0.81	0.8	0.8
Trp	0.21	0.24	0.25	0.25	0.27	0.27	0.05		0.18	0.3	0.39	0.63	0.63	0.61	0.81	0.81	0.81	0.81	0.81	0.8
Cys	0.28	0.22	0.21	0.21	0.2	0.2	0.25	0.35		0.25	0.31	0.6	0.6	0.62	0.81	0.81	0.8	0.8	0.81	0.82
Ala	0.5	0.45	0.43	0.43	0.41	0.41	0.4	0.49	0.22		0.1	0.4	0.41	0.47	0.63	0.63	0.62	0.62	0.63	0.67
Gly	0.61	0.56	0.54	0.54	0.52	0.52	0.5	0.58	0.34	0.1		0.32	0.34	0.42	0.56	0.56	0.54	0.54	0.56	0.61
Ser	0.81	0.8	0.8	0.8	0.8	0.8	0.62	0.63	0.6	0.4	0.3		0.03	0.1	0.21	0.21	0.2	0.2	0.21	0.24
Thr	0.81	0.8	0.8	0.8	0.8	0.8	0.61	0.63	0.6	0.4	0.31	0.03		0.08	0.21	0.21	0.2	0.2	0.21	0.22
His	0.8	0.8	1	1	0.8	0.8	0.6	0.61	0.61	0.42	0.34	0.1	0.08		0.2	0.2	0.21	0.21	0.2	0.2
Glu	1	1	1	1	1	1	0.8	0.81	0.8	0.61	0.52	0.22	0.21	0.2		0	0.03	0.03	0	0.05
Gln	1	1	1	1	1	1	0.8	0.81	0.8	0.61	0.52	0.22	0.21	0.2	0		0.03	0.03	0	0.05
Asp	1	1	1	1	1	1	0.81	0.81	0.8	0.61	0.51	0.21	0.2	0.21	0.03	0.03		0	0.03	0.08
Asn	1	1	1	1	1	1	0.81	0.81	0.8	0.61	0.51	0.21	0.2	0.21	0.03	0.03	0		0.03	0.08
Lys	1	1	1	1	1	1	0.8	0.81	0.8	0.61	0.52	0.22	0.21	0.2	0	0	0.03	0.03		0.05
Arg	1	1	1	1	1.01	1.01	0.8	0.8	0.81	0.62	0.53	0.24	0.22	0.2	0.05	0.05	0.08	0.08	0.05	

=== Miyata's distance ===
Miyata's distance is based on 2 physicochemical properties: volume and polarity.

Distance between amino acids a_{i} and a_{j} is calculated as $d_{ij}=\sqrt{(\Delta p_{ij}/\sigma_p)^2+(\Delta v_{ij}/\sigma_v)^2}$ where $\Delta p_{ij}$ is value of polarity difference between replaced amino acids and $\Delta v_{ij}$ and is difference for volume; $\sigma_p$ and $\sigma_v$ are standard deviations for $\Delta p_{ij}$ and $\Delta v_{ij}$

Amino acid pair distance (d_{ij})
Cys	Pro	Ala	Gly	Ser	Thr	Gln	Glu	Asn	Asp	His	Lys	Arg	Val	Leu	Ile	Met	Phe	Tyr	Trp	
	1.33	1.39	2.22	2.84	1.45	2.48	3.26	2.83	3.48	2.56	3.27	3.06	0.86	1.65	1.63	1.46	2.24	2.38	3.34	Cys
		0.06	0.97	0.56	0.87	1.92	2.48	1.8	2.4	2.15	2.94	2.9	1.79	2.7	2.62	2.36	3.17	3.12	4.17	Pro
			0.91	0.51	0.9	1.92	2.46	1.78	2.37	2.17	2.96	2.92	1.85	2.76	2.69	2.42	3.23	3.18	4.23	Ala
				0.85	1.7	2.48	2.78	1.96	2.37	2.78	3.54	3.58	2.76	3.67	3.6	3.34	4.14	4.08	5.13	Gly
					0.89	1.65	2.06	1.31	1.87	1.94	2.71	2.74	2.15	3.04	2.95	2.67	3.45	3.33	4.38	Ser
						1.12	1.83	1.4	2.05	1.32	2.1	2.03	1.42	2.25	2.14	1.86	2.6	2.45	3.5	Thr
							0.84	0.99	1.47	0.32	1.06	1.13	2.13	2.7	2.57	2.3	2.81	2.48	3.42	Gln
								0.85	0.9	0.96	1.14	1.45	2.97	3.53	3.39	3.13	3.59	3.22	4.08	Glu
									0.65	1.29	1.84	2.04	2.76	3.49	3.37	3.08	3.7	3.42	4.39	Asn
										1.72	2.05	2.34	3.4	4.1	3.98	3.69	4.27	3.95	4.88	Asp
											0.79	0.82	2.11	2.59	2.45	2.19	2.63	2.27	3.16	His
												0.4	2.7	2.98	2.84	2.63	2.85	2.42	3.11	Lys
													2.43	2.62	2.49	2.29	2.47	2.02	2.72	Arg
														0.91	0.85	0.62	1.43	1.52	2.51	Val
															0.14	0.41	0.63	0.94	1.73	Leu
																0.29	0.61	0.86	1.72	Ile
																	0.82	0.93	1.89	Met
																		0.48	1.11	Phe
																			1.06	Tyr
																				Trp

=== Experimental Exchangeability ===
Experimental Exchangeability was devised by Yampolsky and Stoltzfus. It is the measure of the mean effect of exchanging one amino acid into a different amino acid.

It is based on analysis of experimental studies where 9671 amino acids replacements from different proteins, were compared for effect on protein activity.

Exchangeability (x1000) by source (row) and destination (column)
	Cys	Ser	Thr	Pro	Ala	Gly	Asn	Asp	Glu	Gln	His	Arg	Lys	Met	Ile	Leu	Val	Phe	Tyr	Trp	Ex_{src}
Cys	.	258	121	201	334	288	109	109	270	383	258	306	252	169	109	347	89	349	349	139	280
Ser	373	.	481	249	490	418	390	314	343	352	353	363	275	321	270	295	358	334	294	160	351
Thr	325	408	.	164	402	332	240	190	212	308	246	299	256	152	198	271	362	273	260	66	287
Pro	345	392	286	.	454	404	352	254	346	384	369	254	231	257	204	258	421	339	298	305	335
Ala	393	384	312	243	.	387	430	193	275	320	301	295	225	549	245	313	319	305	286	165	312
Gly	267	304	187	140	369	.	210	188	206	272	235	178	219	197	110	193	208	168	188	173	228
Asn	234	355	329	275	400	391	.	208	257	298	248	252	183	236	184	233	233	210	251	120	272
Asp	285	275	245	220	293	264	201	.	344	263	298	252	208	245	299	236	175	233	227	103	258
Glu	332	355	292	216	520	407	258	533	.	341	380	279	323	219	450	321	351	342	348	145	363
Gln	383	443	361	212	499	406	338	68	439	.	396	366	354	504	467	391	603	383	361	159	386
His	331	365	205	220	462	370	225	141	319	301	.	275	332	315	205	364	255	328	260	72	303
Arg	225	270	199	145	459	251	67	124	250	288	263	.	306	68	139	242	189	213	272	63	259
Lys	331	376	476	252	600	492	457	465	272	441	362	440	.	414	491	301	487	360	343	218	409
Met	347	353	261	85	357	218	544	392	287	394	278	112	135	.	612	513	354	330	308	633	307
Ile	362	196	193	145	326	160	172	27	197	191	221	124	121	279	.	417	494	331	323	73	252
Leu	366	212	165	146	343	201	162	112	199	250	288	185	171	367	301	.	275	336	295	152	248
Val	382	326	398	201	389	269	108	228	192	280	253	190	197	562	537	333	.	207	209	286	277
Phe	176	152	257	112	236	94	136	90	62	216	237	122	85	255	181	296	291	.	332	232	193
Tyr	142	173	.	194	402	357	129	87	176	369	197	340	171	392	.	362	.	360	.	303	258
Trp	137	92	17	66	63	162	.	.	65	61	239	103	54	110	.	177	110	364	281	.	142
Ex_{dest}	315	311	293	192	411	321	258	225	262	305	290	255	225	314	293	307	305	294	279	172	291

== Typical and idiosyncratic amino acids ==
Amino acids can also be classified according to how many different amino acids they can be exchanged by through single nucleotide substitution.

- Typical amino acids - there are several other amino acids which they can change into through single nucleotide substitution. Typical amino acids and their alternatives usually have similar physicochemical properties. Leucine is an example of a typical amino acid.
- Idiosyncratic amino acids - there are few similar amino acids that they can mutate to through single nucleotide substitution. In this case most amino acid replacements will be disruptive for protein function. Tryptophan is an example of an idiosyncratic amino acid.

== Tendency to undergo amino acid replacement ==
Some amino acids are more likely to be replaced. One of the factors that influences this tendency is physicochemical distance. Example of a measure of amino acid can be Graur's Stability Index. The assumption of this measure is that the amino acid replacement rate and protein's evolution is dependent on the amino acid composition of protein. Stability index S of an amino acid is calculated based on physicochemical distances of this amino acid and its alternatives than can mutate through single nucleotide substitution and probabilities to replace into these amino acids. Based on Grantham's distance the most immutable amino acid is cysteine, and the most prone to undergo exchange is methionine.

Example of calculating stability index for Methionine coded by AUG based on Grantham's physicochemical distance
Alternative codons	Alternative amino acids	Probabilities	Grantham's distances	Average distance
AUU, AUC, AUA	Isoleucine	1/3	10	3.33
ACG	Threonine	1/9	81	9.00
AAG	Lysine	1/9	95	10.56
AGG	Arginine	1/9	91	10.11
UUG, CUG	Leucine	2/9	15	3.33
GUG	Valine	1/9	21	2.33
Stability index				38.67

== Patterns of amino acid replacement ==
Evolution of proteins is slower than DNA since only nonsynonymous mutations in DNA can result in amino acid replacements. Most mutations are neutral to maintain protein function and structure. Therefore, the more similar amino acids are, the more probable that they will be replaced. Conservative replacements are more common than radical replacements, since they can result in less important phenotypic changes. On the other hand, beneficial mutations, enhancing protein functions are most likely to be radical replacements. Also, the physicochemical distances, which are based on amino acids properties, are negatively correlated with probability of amino acids substitutions. Smaller distance between amino acids indicates that they are more likely to undergo replacement.
