= Serial homology =

Homology type

Serial homology is a special type of homology, defined by Owen as "representative or repetitive relation in the segments of the same organism." Ernst Haeckel preferred the term "homotypy" for the same phenomenon.

Classical examples of serial homologies are the development of forelimbs and hind limbs of tetrapods and the iterative structure of the vertebrae. The study on maniraptoran limbs supports the hypothesized influence of limb serial homology on macroevolutionary patterns, as the high degree of morphological integration between the forelimbs and hindlimbs suggests that intrinsic underlying factors involving shared developmental programs drove their concomitant evolutionary change. This integration is consistent with prior experimental findings in avian embryos, demonstrating that shared developmental pathways structure the covariation of serially homologous limbs.

== See also ==
- Deep homology
- Evolutionary developmental biology
