= Dayhoff =

Dayhoff is a surname. Notable people with the surname include:

- Harry Dayhoff (1896–1963), American football player
- Margaret Oakley Dayhoff (1925–1983), American physical chemist and bioinformatician
- Ruth Dayhoff (born 1952), American physician and bioinformatician, daughter of Margaret
- Richard Paul Dayhoff (born 1959), American fraud examiner and auditor, son of Paul
