= Steven Henikoff =

American biochemist

- Education: University of Chicago; Harvard University
- Known for: BLOSUM
- Spouse: Jorja Henikoff
- Scientific career
- Fields: Biochemistry
- Workplaces: Fred Hutchinson Cancer Research Center

Steven Henikoff is a scientist at the Fred Hutchinson Cancer Research Center, and an HHMI Investigator. His field of study is chromatin-related transcriptional regulation. He earned his BS in chemistry at the University of Chicago. He earned his PhD in biochemistry and molecular biology from Harvard University in the lab of Matt Meselson in 1977. He did a postdoctoral fellowship at the University of Washington. His research has been funded by the National Science Foundation, National Institutes of Health, and HHMI. In 1992, Steven Henikoff, together with his wife Jorja Henikoff, introduced the BLOSUM substitution matrices. The BLOSUM matrices are widely used for sequence alignment of proteins. In 2005, Henikoff was elected to the National Academy of Sciences.

In 2025 Steven Henikoff was awarded the Rosenstiel Award for his transformative research on genome organization and gene expression.
