= VistA Imaging =

VistA Imaging is an FDA-listed Image Management system used in the Department of Veterans Affairs healthcare facilities nationwide. It is one of the most widely used image management systems in routine healthcare use, and is used to manage many different varieties of images associated with a patient's medical record. The system was started as a research project by Ruth Dayhoff in 1986 and was formally launched in 1991.

== Hardware requirements ==
The VistA Imaging System uses hardware components to provide short- and long-term storage. It takes advantage of network servers for storage. It uses a DICOM gateway system to communicate with commercial Picture Archiving and Communication Systems (PACS) and modalities such as CT, MR, and Computed Radiography (x-ray) devices for image capture. It utilizes a background processor for moving the images to the proper storage device and for managing storage space.

== Types of data managed ==
The system not only manages radiologic images, but also is able to capture and manage EKGs, pathology images, gastroenterology (endoscopic) images, laparoscopic images, scanned paperwork, or essentially any type of health care image.

== Integration with Electronic Health Record systems ==
VistA Imaging is currently integrated into the VistA EMR (electronic medical record) system used nationwide in Department of Veterans Affairs hospitals. This integration is able to provide increased efficiency of retrieval of images. It has also been used as a separate software package and can be used with EHRs other than VistA.

VistA Imaging now connects to a nationwide backbone that allows clinicians to access the 350 million images stored in the VA system via Remote Image View software.

The VA has developed interfaces for more than 250 medical devices in VistA Imaging, the images from which can be accessed through the desktop VistA Imaging Viewer. The Department of Defense will use the VistA Imaging Viewer to enhance its own EHR.

== Usage in a National Network of Healthcare Records ==
As part of the US national mandate to co-ordinate care between Department of Defense and the VA, VistA Imaging is forming a cornerstone of the effort to exchange medical imagery between the two systems. “When soldiers come back from Iraq and Afghanistan and eventually enter the VA system, images will be able to move from DOD to VA seamlessly." Eventually, DOD and VA should be able to share all image file types from all sites. Additional enhancements to VistA Imaging include development of a central archive for all VA images (whether acquired through VistA or a commercial system) and new indexing and search capabilities.

== Availability ==
The software for VistA Imaging has been made available through the Freedom of Information Act so that it is in the public domain. Due to its designation as a medical device, however, it can not be designated as free open source software and therefore can not be altered or implemented without FDA approval.

Although it can be used in healthcare facilities that are outside the Department of Veterans Affairs, this is possible only if the proprietary modules that have been integrated into it are also licensed and implementation is registered with the FDA. This has effectively limited its use to government institutions who have licensed the proprietary modules.

The source code can be downloaded from the OSEHRA VistA-M.git tree.

== Proprietary modules required ==
VistA Imaging uses proprietary modules not in the public domain. This makes its public domain use limited.

== Information retrieval after a natural disaster ==
The VistA Imaging system was robust enough to be restored after Hurricane Katrina damaged the data facility at the New Orleans VA. This type of backup proved superior to a paper record system.
