= Ruth Dayhoff =

American physician and medical bioinformatician

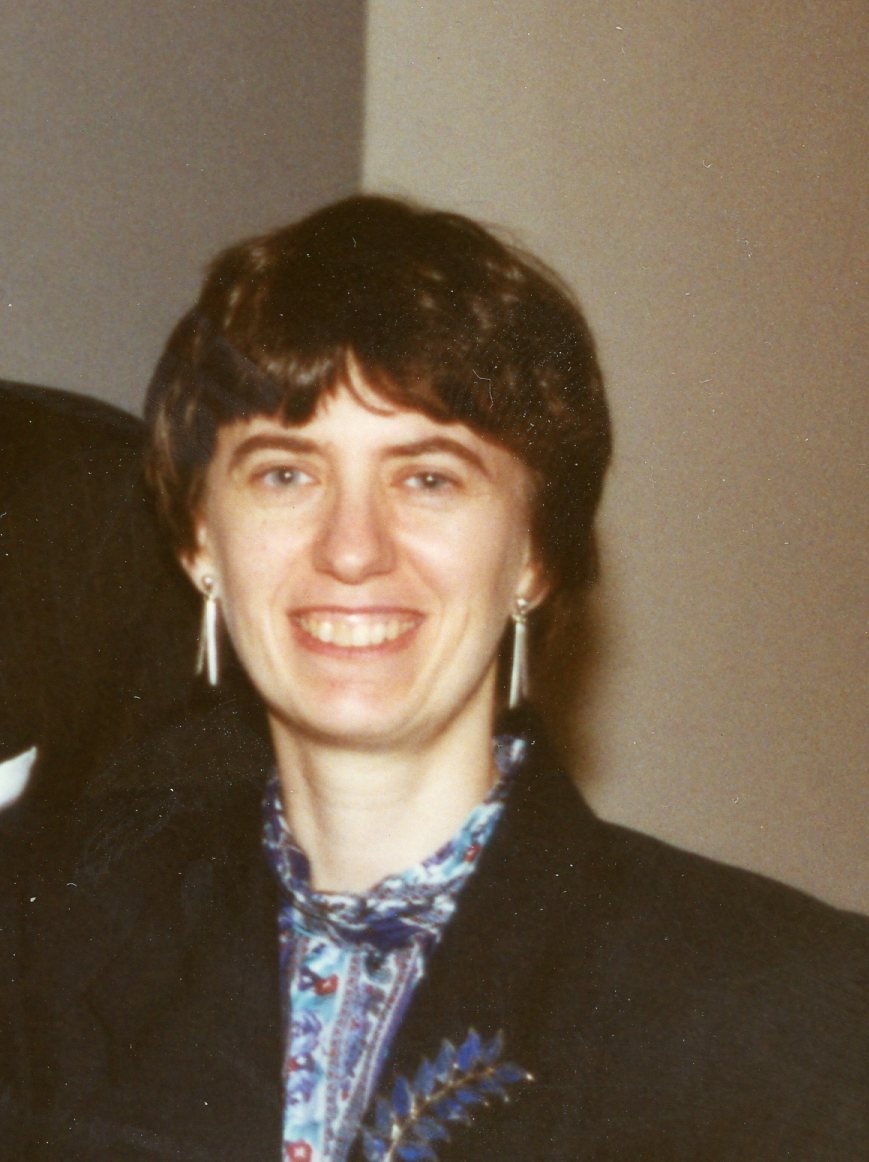
- Ruth Dayhoff
- Born: May 16, 1952
- Died: July 29, 2025 (aged 73)
- Education: University of Maryland
- Occupations: Physician and medical bioinformatician
- Known for: VistA imaging system
- Relatives: Margaret Oakley Dayhoff (mother)
- Medical career
- Profession: Director of Digital Imaging in Medicine
- Field: Integrated hospital digital imaging systems
- Institutions: United States Department of Veterans Affairs

Ruth Dayhoff (May 16, 1952 – July 29, 2025) was an American physician and medical bioinformatician.

== Early life ==
Dayhoff was the daughter of Margaret Oakley Dayhoff, an early bioinformatician, and Edward S Dayhoff, a distinguished physicist in the area of electro-optics. From a young age, Dayhoff was encouraged by her mother to pursue scientific interests. In Dayhoff's words:

My mother was a science professor in a medical school and convinced me that I had to understand not only what physicians knew, but also how they worked and made decisions. I had always thought that computers would be important to the future of medicine and biology. I was interested in all of these areas as I was growing up, and I had a choice whether to study computer science or go to medical school. So I decided to go to medical school to better understand not only the treatment of patients but the actions and knowledge of physicians.

== Education ==
Dayhoff completed her undergraduate studies at the University of Maryland. During her undergraduate career, she majored in mathematics. Dayhoff graduated in 1973 after only 3 years, earning the highest honors. She went on to attend medical school at Georgetown University School of Medicine and graduated in 1977. Dayhoff had started working on Computer systems while in High School. During her time at Georgetown, she began to pursue informatics. While in Medical School she authored the MUMPS Primer with Martin Johnson. Dayhoff completed her second residency in 1980 at Johns Hopkins University School of Medicine, where she studied clinical pathology and gave special attention to Laboratory Information Systems. Dayhoff was one of the organizers of the original Symposium on Computer Applications in Medical Care, later renamed American Medical Informatics Association. She was elected a Founding Fellow of the American College of Medical Informatics in 1983.

== Career ==
Dayhoff pioneered integrated hospital digital imaging systems. She built a prototype demonstration of the VistA Imaging system in her basement in 1986. Dayhoff has held high-ranking positions in the US Department of Veterans Affairs' VistA Imaging Project since 1989. She served as the national projects manager and retired as Director of Digital Imaging in Medicine. As national projects manager, she supervised integration of old patient records with the VA computerized system for patient records. This system is currently implemented at the VA Medical Center in Washington, D.C., where it has been running for twenty years, and at over 150 other medical institutions. A version of the system was installed at the National Cancer institute of Egypt. Dayhoff was chosen by the National Library of Medicine as one of the outstanding women physicians in America who "changed the face of medicine".

In 2020, the Society for Imaging Informatics in Medicine announced the creation of the annual Dr. Ruth Dayhoff Award for the Advancement of Women in Medical Imaging Informatics.

== Personal life ==
Dayhoff was married with two daughters and five grandchildren. She said that her husband, Vincent Brannigan, has provided invaluable support throughout the years by sharing household responsibilities.

== Death ==
Dayhoff died on July 29, 2025.
