= Porphyromonas catoniae =

Scientific classification
- Domain: Bacteria
- Kingdom: Pseudomonadati
- Phylum: Bacteroidota
- Class: Bacteroidia
- Order: Bacteroidales
- Family: Porphyromonadaceae
- Genus: Porphyromonas
- Species: P. catoniae

Binomial name
- Porphyromonas catoniae (Moore and Moore 1994) Willems and Collins 1995

Type strain
- ATCC 51270, CCUG 41358, JCM 13863, NCTC 13056, VPI N3B-3

Synonyms
- Oribaculum catoniae

Species of bacterium

Porphyromonas catoniae is a Gram-negative and anaerobic bacterium from the genus Porphyromonas which has been isolated from the human gingival crevice, originating from oral mucosal surfaces fused to saliva.

It is a bacterial genus that belongs to the respiratory core microbiome and is important in the pulmonary niche. In recent research, it was found that Porphyromonas catoniae plays a potential role in the lung microbiome of patients with Cystic Fibrosis. Genomes of the commensal species Porphyromonas isolated from Cystic Fibrosis patients did not harbour the virulence genes that are typically associated with Porphyromonas Ginigivalis.
