= Microbacter margulisiae =

Scientific classification
- Domain: Bacteria
- Kingdom: Pseudomonadati
- Phylum: Bacteroidota
- Class: Bacteroidia
- Order: Bacteroidales
- Family: Porphyromonadaceae
- Genus: Microbacter
- Species: M. margulisiae

Binomial name
- Microbacter margulisiae Sánchez-Andrea et al. 2014

Type strain
- DSM 27471, JCM 19374, ADRI

Species of bacterium

Microbacter margulisiae is a Gram-negative, anaerobic, non-spore-forming and non-motile bacterium from the genus of Microbacter which has been isolated from sediments from the Tinto River in Huelva in Spain.
