= Porphyromonas canoris =

Scientific classification
- Domain: Bacteria
- Kingdom: Pseudomonadati
- Phylum: Bacteroidota
- Class: Bacteroidia
- Order: Bacteroidales
- Family: Porphyromonadaceae
- Genus: Porphyromonas
- Species: P. canoris

Binomial name
- Porphyromonas canoris Love et al. 1994

Type strain
- CCUG 36550, CIP 104881, JCM 16132, NCTC 12835, VPB 4878

Species of bacterium

Porphyromonas canoris is a Gram-negative, obligately anaerobic, non-spore-forming and non-motile bacterium from the genus Porphyromonas which has been isolated from subgingival plaque from dogs.
