= Porphyromonas levii =

Scientific classification
- Domain: Bacteria
- Kingdom: Pseudomonadati
- Phylum: Bacteroidota
- Class: Bacteroidia
- Order: Bacteroidales
- Family: Porphyromonadaceae
- Genus: Porphyromonas
- Species: P. levii

Binomial name
- Porphyromonas levii (Johnson and Holdeman 1983) Shah et al. 1995

Type strain
- ACM 5042, ATCC 29147, CCUG 21027, CCUG 34320, HAMBI 467, JCM 13866, LEV, Lev 1, NCTC 11028, VPI 10450, VPI 3300

Synonyms
- Bacteroides melaninogenicus subsp. levi Bacteroides levii

Species of bacterium

Porphyromonas levii is a Gram-negative, anaerobic bacterium from the genus Porphyromonas, which has been isolated from a bovine rumen.
