= Porphyromonas macacae =

Scientific classification
- Domain: Bacteria
- Kingdom: Pseudomonadati
- Phylum: Bacteroidota
- Class: Bacteroidia
- Order: Bacteroidales
- Family: Porphyromonadaceae
- Genus: Porphyromonas
- Species: P. macacae

Binomial name
- Porphyromonas macacae (Slots and Genco 1980) Love 1995

Type strain
- 7728-L6C, ATCC 33141, CCUG 47703, DSM 20710, JCM 13914, NCTC 13100, Slots 7728-L6C, Slots' 7728-L6C, Slots'

Synonyms
- Bacteroides macacae Bacteroides melaninogenicus subsp. macacae Bacteroides salivosus Porphyromonas salivosa

Species of bacterium

Porphyromonas macacae is a Gram-negative, non-spore-forming, anaerobic and non-motile bacterium from the genus Porphyromonas which has been isolated from the periodontal pocket of the macaque Macaca arctoides.
