= Porphyromonas somerae =

Scientific classification
- Domain: Bacteria
- Kingdom: Pseudomonadati
- Phylum: Bacteroidota
- Class: Bacteroidia
- Order: Bacteroidales
- Family: Porphyromonadaceae
- Genus: Porphyromonas
- Species: P. somerae

Binomial name
- Porphyromonas somerae Summanen et al. 2006

Type strain
- ATCC BAA-1230, CCUG 51464, JCM 13867, WAL 6690

Species of bacterium

Porphyromonas somerae is a Gram-negative and anaerobic bacterium from the genus Porphyromonas which has been isolated from a human leg ulcer in the United States.
