= European Nucleotide Archive =

Online database from the EBI on Nucleotides

European Nucleotide Archive (ENA)

Content
- Description: Comprehensive archive of nucleotide sequences, annotations and associated data.
- Data types captured: Nucleotide sequence, functional annotation, sequencing reads and sequencer information, sample details, other related records.
- Organisms: All

Contact
- Research center: European Bioinformatics Institute
- Laboratory: PANDA Group
- Primary citation: PMID 20972220
- Release date: April 1982

Access
- Data format: XML; FASTQ; EMBL-Bank format
- Website: ENA
- Download URL: ENA download
- Web service URL: ENA browser

Tools
- Standalone: CRAM toolkit

Miscellaneous
- License: Unrestricted

The European Nucleotide Archive (ENA) is a repository providing free and unrestricted access to annotated DNA and RNA sequences. It also stores complementary information such as experimental procedures, details of sequence assembly and other metadata related to sequencing projects. The archive is composed of three main databases: the Sequence Read Archive, the Trace Archive and the EMBL Nucleotide Sequence Database (also known as EMBL-bank). The ENA is produced and maintained by the European Bioinformatics Institute and is a member of the International Nucleotide Sequence Database Collaboration (INSDC) along with the DNA Data Bank of Japan and GenBank.

The ENA has grown out of the EMBL Data Library which was released in 1982 as the first internationally supported resource for nucleotide sequence data. As of early 2012, the ENA and other INSDC member databases each contained complete genomes of 5,682 organisms and sequence data for almost 700,000. Moreover, the volume of data is increasing exponentially with a doubling time of approximately 10 months.

== History ==
The European Nucleotide Archive originated from separate databases, the earliest of which was the EMBL Data Library, established in October 1980 at the European Molecular Biology Laboratory (EMBL), Heidelberg. The first release of this database was made in April 1982 and contained a total of 568 separate entries consisting of around 500,000 base pairs. In 1984, referring to the EMBL Data Library, Kneale and Kennard remarked that "it was clear some years ago that a large computerized database of sequences would be essential for research in Molecular Biology".

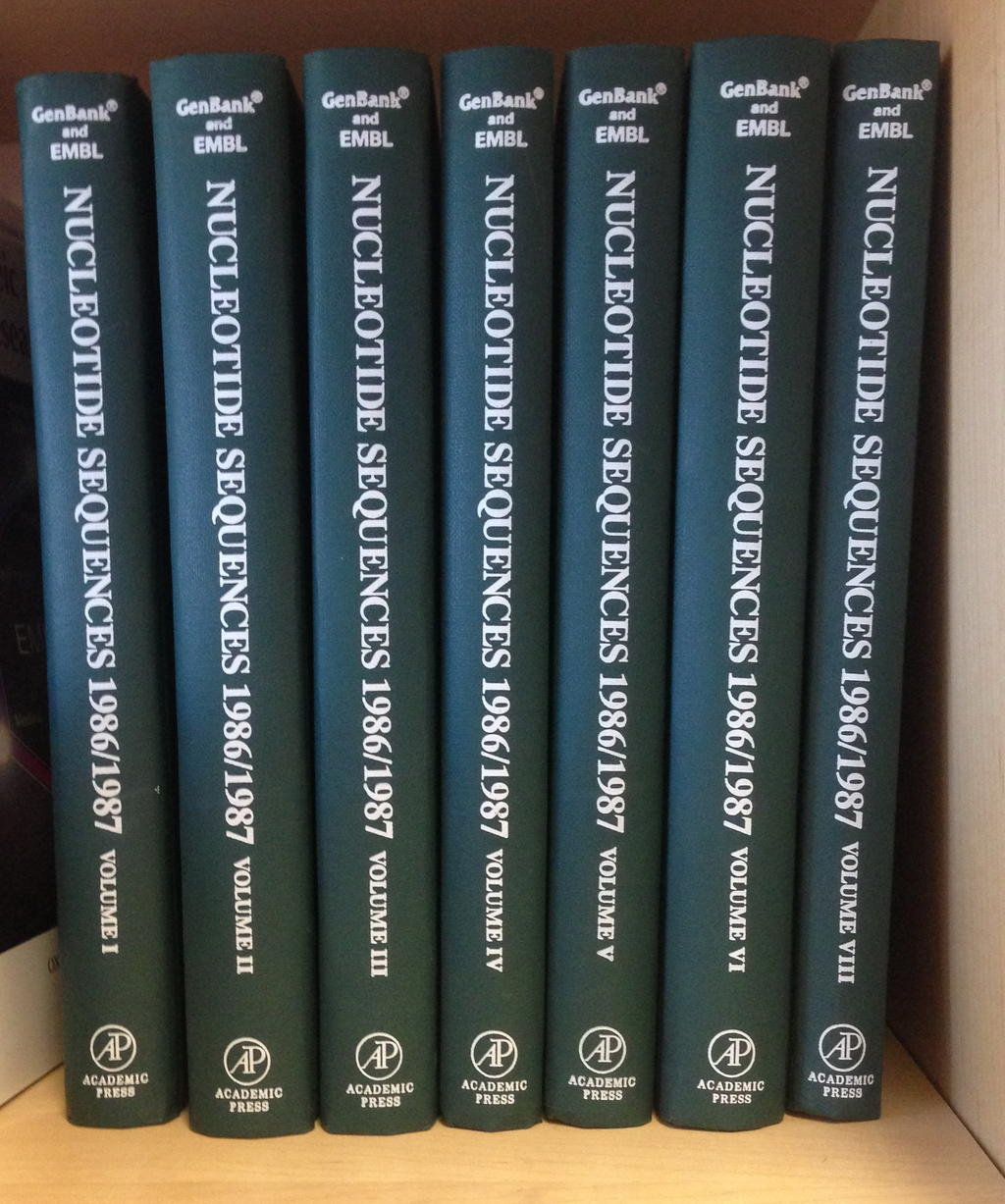
Nucleotide sequence data in book form.

Despite the primary distribution method at the time being via magnetic tape, by 1987, the EMBL Data Library was being used by an estimated 10,000 scientists internationally. The same year, the EMBL File Server was introduced to serve database records over BITNET, EARN and the early Internet. In May 1988 the journal Nucleic Acids Research introduced a policy stating that "manuscripts submitted to [Nucleic Acids Research] and containing or discussing sequence data must be accompanied by evidence that the data have been deposited with the EMBL Data Library."

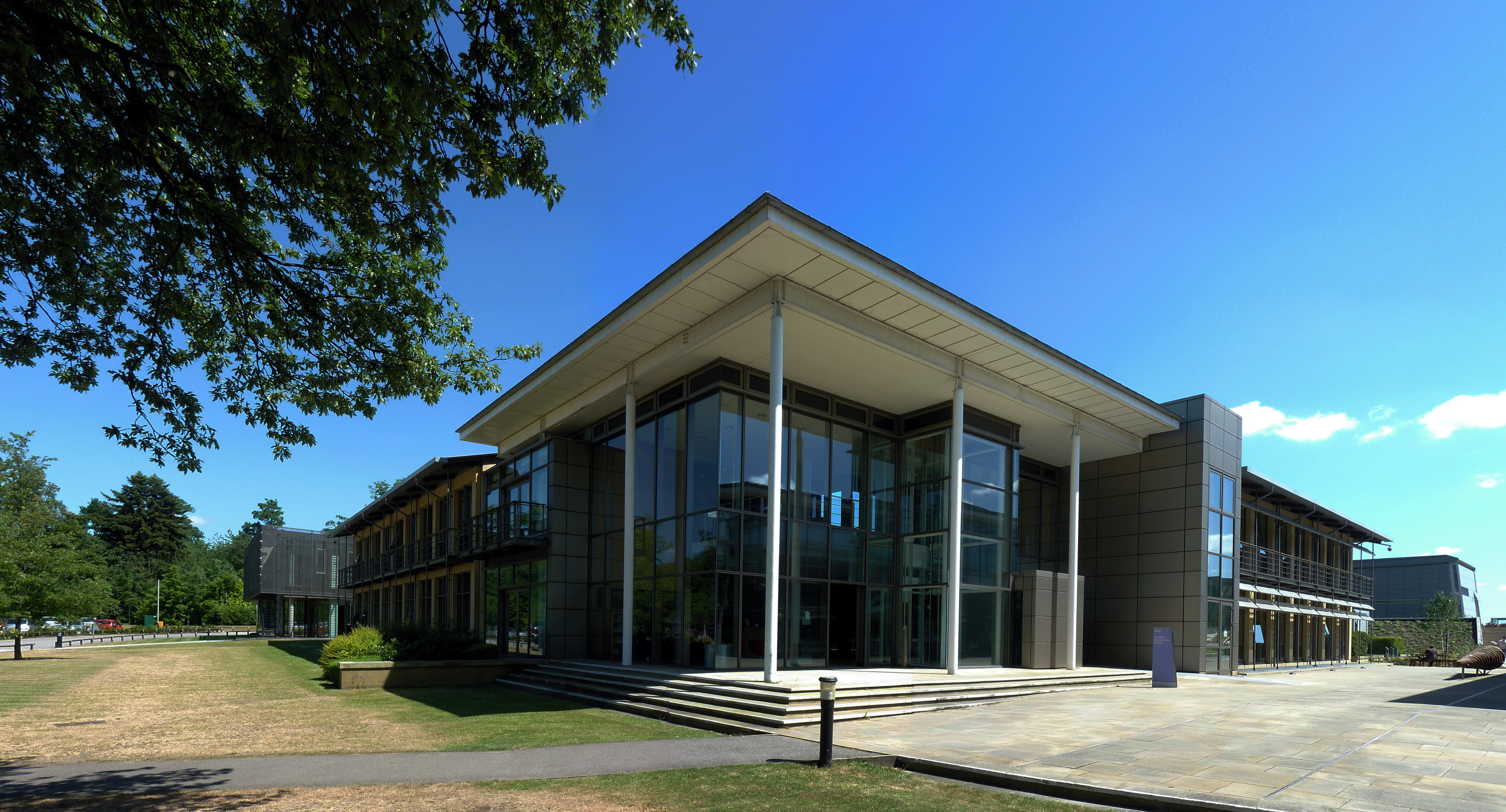
The EBI at the Wellcome Trust Genome Campus in Hinxton, UK which hosts the European Nucleotide Archive.

During the 1990s the EMBL Data Library was renamed the EMBL Nucleotide Sequence Database and was formally relocated to the European Bioinformatics Institute (EBI) from Heidelberg. In 2003, the Nucleotide Sequence Database was extended with the addition of the Sequence Version Archive (SVA), which maintains records of all current and previous entries in the database. A year later in June 2004, limits on the maximum sequence length for each record (then 350 kilobases) were removed, allowing entire genome sequences to be stored as a single database entry.

Following the uptake of Sanger sequencing, the Wellcome Trust Sanger Institute (then known as The Sanger Centre) had begun cataloguing sequence reads along with quality information in a database called The Trace Archive. The Trace Archive grew substantially with the commercialisation of high-throughput parallel sequencing technologies by companies such as Roche and Illumina. In 2008, the EBI combined the Trace Archive, EMBL Nucleotide Sequence Database (now also known as EMBL-Bank) and a newly developed Sequence (or Short) Read Archive (SRA) to make up the ENA, aimed at providing a comprehensive nucleotide sequence archive. As a member of the International Nucleotide Sequence Database Collaboration, the ENA exchanges data submissions each day with both the DNA Data Bank of Japan and GenBank.

== EMBL Nucleotide Sequence Database ==
The EMBL Nucleotide Sequence Database (EMBL-Bank) has increased in size from around 600 entries in 1982 to over 2.5×10^{8} by December 2012.

The EMBL Nucleotide Sequence Database (also known as EMBL-Bank) is the section of the ENA which contains high-level genome assembly details, as well as assembled sequences and their functional annotation. EMBL-Bank is contributed to by direct submission from genome consortia and smaller research groups as well as by the retrieval of sequence data associated with patent applications.

As of release 114 (December 2012), the EMBL Nucleotide Sequence Database contains approximately 5×10^{11} nucleotides with an uncompressed filesize of 1.6 terabytes.

=== Data classes ===
The EMBL Nucleotide Sequence Database supports a variety of data derived from different sources including, but not limited to:

- Expressed sequence tags with their associated sample data.
- Nucleotide sequence being generated from whole genome sequencing projects at varying stages of assembly, including complete contigs and annotated, fully assembled sequence.
- Data relating to transcriptomics, such as complementary DNA, with optional annotation.
- Novel or extended annotations of existing coding sequences, for example new sequence versions with corrected start or stop codons.

=== EMBL-Bank format ===
The EMBL Nucleotide Sequence Database uses a flat file plaintext format to represent and store data which is typically referred to as EMBL-Bank format. EMBL-Bank format uses a different syntax to the records in DDBJ and GenBank, though each format uses certain standardised nomenclature, such as taxonomies as defined by the NCBI Taxon database. Each line of an EMBL-format file begins with a two-letter code, such as AC to label the accession number and KW for a list of keywords relevant to the record; each record ends with //.

== Sequence Read Archive ==
The SRA has grown rapidly since 2008. As of 2011, most SRA sequence data was produced by Illumina's Genome Analyzer.

The ENA operates an instance of the Sequence Read Archive (SRA), an archival repository of sequence reads and analyses which are intended for public release. Originally called the Short Read Archive, the name was changed in anticipation of future sequencing technologies being able to produce longer sequence reads. Currently, the archive accepts sequence reads generated by next-generation sequencing platforms such as the Illumina Genome Analyzer and ABI SOLiD as well as some corresponding analyses and alignments. The SRA operates under the guidance of the International Nucleotide Sequence Database Collaboration (INSDC) and is the fastest-growing repository in the ENA.

In 2010 the Sequence Read Archive made up approximately 95% of the base pair data available through the ENA, encompassing over 500,000,000,000 sequence reads made up of over 60 trillion (6×10^{13}) base pairs. Almost half of this data was deposited in relation to the 1000 Genomes Project wherein the researchers published their sequence data to the SRA in real-time. In total, as of September 2010, 65% of the Sequence Read Archive was human genomic sequence, with another 16% relating to human metagenome sequence reads.

The preferred data format for files submitted to the SRA is the BAM format, which is capable of storing both aligned and unaligned reads. Internally the SRA relies on the NCBI SRA Toolkit, used at all three INSDC member databases, to provide flexible data compression, API access and conversion to other formats such as FASTQ.

== Data access ==
Screenshot of the ENA browser web interface, showing an HTML record.

The data contained in the ENA can be accessed manually or programmatically via REST URL through the ENA browser. Initially limited to the Sequence Read Archive, the ENA browser now also provides access to the Trace Archive and EMBL-Bank, allowing file retrieval in a range of formats including XML, HTML, FASTA and FASTQ. Individual records can be accessed using their accession numbers and other text queries are enabled through the EB-eye search engine. Additionally, sequence similarity-based searches implemented using De Bruijn graphs offer another method of retrieving records from the ENA.

The ENA is accessible via the EBI SOAP and REST APIs, which also offer access to other databases hosted at the EBI, such as Ensembl and InterPro.

== Storage ==
The European Nucleotide Archive handles large volumes of data which pose a significant storage challenge. As of 2012, the ENA's storage requirements continue to grow exponentially, with a doubling time of approximately 10 months. To manage this increase, the ENA selectively discards less-valuable sequencing platform data and implements advanced compression strategies. The CRAM reference-based compression toolkit was developed to help reduce ENA storage requirements.

== Funding ==
Currently the ENA is funded jointly by the European Molecular Biology Laboratory, the European Commission and the Wellcome Trust. The emerging ELIXIR framework, coordinated by EBI director Janet Thornton, aims to secure a sustainable European funding infrastructure to support the continued availability of life science databases such as the ENA.

== See also ==
- DNA Data Bank of Japan
- ENCODE
- Ensembl Genomes
- GenBank
- RefSeq
- UniGene
