= Macellibacteroides fermentans =

Scientific classification
- Domain: Bacteria
- Kingdom: Pseudomonadati
- Phylum: Bacteroidota
- Class: Bacteroidia
- Order: Bacteroidales
- Family: Porphyromonadaceae
- Genus: Macellibacteroides
- Species: M. fermentans

Binomial name
- Macellibacteroides fermentans Jabari et al. 2012

Type strain
- CCUG 60892, DSM 23697, JCM 16313, LIND7H

Species of bacterium

Macellibacteroides fermentans is a non-spore-forming, obligately anaerobic, rod-shaped and mesophilic bacterium from the genus of Macellibacteroides which has been isolated from an upflow anaerobic filter fore treating abattoir wastewaters in Tunisia.
