= Lipoprotein rotamase A =

Bacterial protein

Lipoprotein rotamase A (SlrA), also known as peptidyl prolyl isomerase A (PpiA), functions as a molecular chaperone that operates within the Streptococcus pneumoniae cell membrane-cell wall interface as well as outside the bacteria. SlrA shares homology with the cyclophilin-type peptidyl-prolyl isomerases (PPIases). PPIases accelerate the folding of proteins by catalyzing the cis-trans isomer conversions of peptide bonds in the amino acid proline.

== Structure ==
AlphaFold predicted structure of SlrA

SlrA is a 29kDa, 267-amino acid long membrane-bound lipoprotein. It is encoded by the S. pneumoniae gene, SP_0771, located at position 729,840–730,643 on the complementary strand. The structure of SlrA is predicted to contain an eight-strand β-bundle and two associated α-helices, similar to the PPIase domains of cyclophilins.

Lipidated forms of SlrA occur in all sequenced streptococcal genomes with the homologs sharing 60-70% amino acid sequence identity. SlrA also shares homology with other Gram-positive cyclophilins such as the membrane-bound PpiA in Lactococcus lactis.

== Function ==
As a PPIase, SlrA functions at the rate-limiting step of protein folding of secreted proteins. The identity of the proteins folded by SlrA and SlrA homologs are still under investigation, but the roles of these proteins can be hypothesized based on the phenotypes observed in mutants without SlrA. The SlrA homologs in Streptococcus mutans and Streptococcus gordonii, PpiA, also display anti-phagocytic activity in their respective bacteria. SlrA has been implicated in S. pneumoniae colonization, competence, cell wall integrity, and adhesion to human cells derived from the upper and lower respiratory tract. It is hypothesized that SlrA acts as a protein-folding chaperone for client proteins involved in those key processes. Additionally, SlrA has been shown to indirectly contribute to S. pneumoniae anti-phagocytic activity.
