= Porphyromonas uenonis =

Scientific classification
- Domain: Bacteria
- Kingdom: Pseudomonadati
- Phylum: Bacteroidota
- Class: Bacteroidia
- Order: Bacteroidales
- Family: Porphyromonadaceae
- Genus: Porphyromonas
- Species: P. uenonis

Binomial name
- Porphyromonas uenonis Finegold et al. 2005

Type strain
- ATCC BAA-906, CCUG 48615, JCM 13868, WAL 9902

Species of bacterium

Porphyromonas uenonis is a bacterium from the genus Porphyromonas which has been isolated from a human sacral decubitus ulcer in Los Angeles in the United States.
