= Falsiporphyromonas endometrii =

Scientific classification
- Domain: Bacteria
- Kingdom: Pseudomonadati
- Phylum: Bacteroidota
- Class: Bacteroidia
- Order: Bacteroidales
- Family: Porphyromonadaceae
- Genus: Falsiporphyromonas
- Species: F. endometrii

Binomial name
- Falsiporphyromonas endometrii Wagener et al. 2014

Type strain
- CCUG 64267, DSM 27210, LMM 40

Species of bacterium

Falsiporphyromonas endometrii is an anaerobic bacterium from the genus of Falsiporphyromonas which has been isolated from the post-partum bovine uterus of a holstein cow in Klein Bennebek in Germany.
