= Porphyromonas circumdentaria =

Scientific classification
- Domain: Bacteria
- Kingdom: Pseudomonadati
- Phylum: Bacteroidota
- Class: Bacteroidia
- Order: Bacteroidales
- Family: Porphyromonadaceae
- Genus: Porphyromonas
- Species: P. circumdentaria

Binomial name
- Porphyromonas circumdentaria Love et al. 1992

Type strain
- ATCC 51356, CCUG 33479, CCUG 41934, JCM 13864, NCTC 12469, VPB 3329

Species of bacterium

Porphyromonas circumdentaria is a Gram-negative and anaerobic bacterium from the genus Porphyromonas which has been isolated from a subcutaneous abscess of a cat in Australia.
