= Porphyromonas pogonae =

Scientific classification
- Domain: Bacteria
- Kingdom: Pseudomonadati
- Phylum: Bacteroidota
- Class: Bacteroidia
- Order: Bacteroidales
- Family: Porphyromonadaceae
- Genus: Porphyromonas
- Species: P. pogonae

Binomial name
- Porphyromonas pogonae Sakamoto et al. 2015

Type strain
- ATCC BAA-2643, JCM 19732, PAGU 1787, MI10-1288x, PAGU1776, PAGU1785, MI 10-1288

Species of bacterium

Porphyromonas pogonae is a Gram-negative bacterium from the genus Porphyromonas which has been isolated from human clinical specimen.
