= RGP =

RGP may refer to:

== Arts and entertainment ==
- RGP (duo), South Korean reggae duo
- Rimba Grand Prix, fictional auto-racing company in Rimba Racer

== Businesses and organisations ==
- Resources Global Professionals, a company
- Revolutionary Goans Party, a political party in Goa, India
- Royal Gibraltar Police

== Science and technology ==
- Redemption grace period, to reclaim a lost domain name
- Rigid gas permeable, a type of contact lens
- Gingipain R, an enzyme

== Transport ==
- Reading Green Park railway station in Reading, England
