= Porphyromonas bennonis =

Scientific classification
- Domain: Bacteria
- Kingdom: Pseudomonadati
- Phylum: Bacteroidota
- Class: Bacteroidia
- Order: Bacteroidales
- Family: Porphyromonadaceae
- Genus: Porphyromonas
- Species: P. bennonis

Binomial name
- Porphyromonas bennonis Summanen et al. 2009

Type strain
- ATCC BAA-1629, CCUG 55979, JCM 16335, WAL 1926C

Species of bacterium

Porphyromonas bennonis is a Gram-negative, anaerobic and non-spore-forming bacterium from the genus Porphyromonas which has been isolated from human clinical specimens.
