= Porphyromonas cangingivalis =

Scientific classification
- Domain: Bacteria
- Kingdom: Pseudomonadati
- Phylum: Bacteroidota
- Class: Bacteroidia
- Order: Bacteroidales
- Family: Porphyromonadaceae
- Genus: Porphyromonas
- Species: P. cangingivalis

Binomial name
- Porphyromonas cangingivalis Collins et al., 1994

Type strain
- AHN 4309, ATCC 700135, CCUG 47700, JCM 13862, JCM 15983, NCTC 12856, VPB 4874

Synonyms
- Porphyromonas canigingivae

Species of bacterium

Porphyromonas cangingivalis is a species of Gram-negative bacterium from the genus Porphyromonas which occur in the periodontal pockets of dogs. It is the most prevalent species of bacteria found in the plaque of dogs. P. cangingivalis can cause periodontitis in animals.
