= Type IX secretion system =

- Discovered: 2010
- Discovered by: M.J. McBride and K. Nakayama
- Organisms: Bacterial species from the phylum Bacteroidetes
- Function: Protein secretions, virulence factor exportation, motility (gliding)
- Pathogenicity: Periodontal disease, immune evasion, tissue disruption
- Key proteins: PorL, PorM, PorN, PorK, PorT, SprA/Sov,

The type IX secretion system is a specialized protein bacterial secretion system found in the Fibrobacteres-Chlorobi-Bacteroidetes superphylum. It plays a crucial role in various cellular processes, including gliding motility and the secretion of virulence factors in Porphyromonas gingivalis. To date, at least nineteen components of the T9SS have been identified, though their precise architecture and mechanistic functions remain incompletely understood.

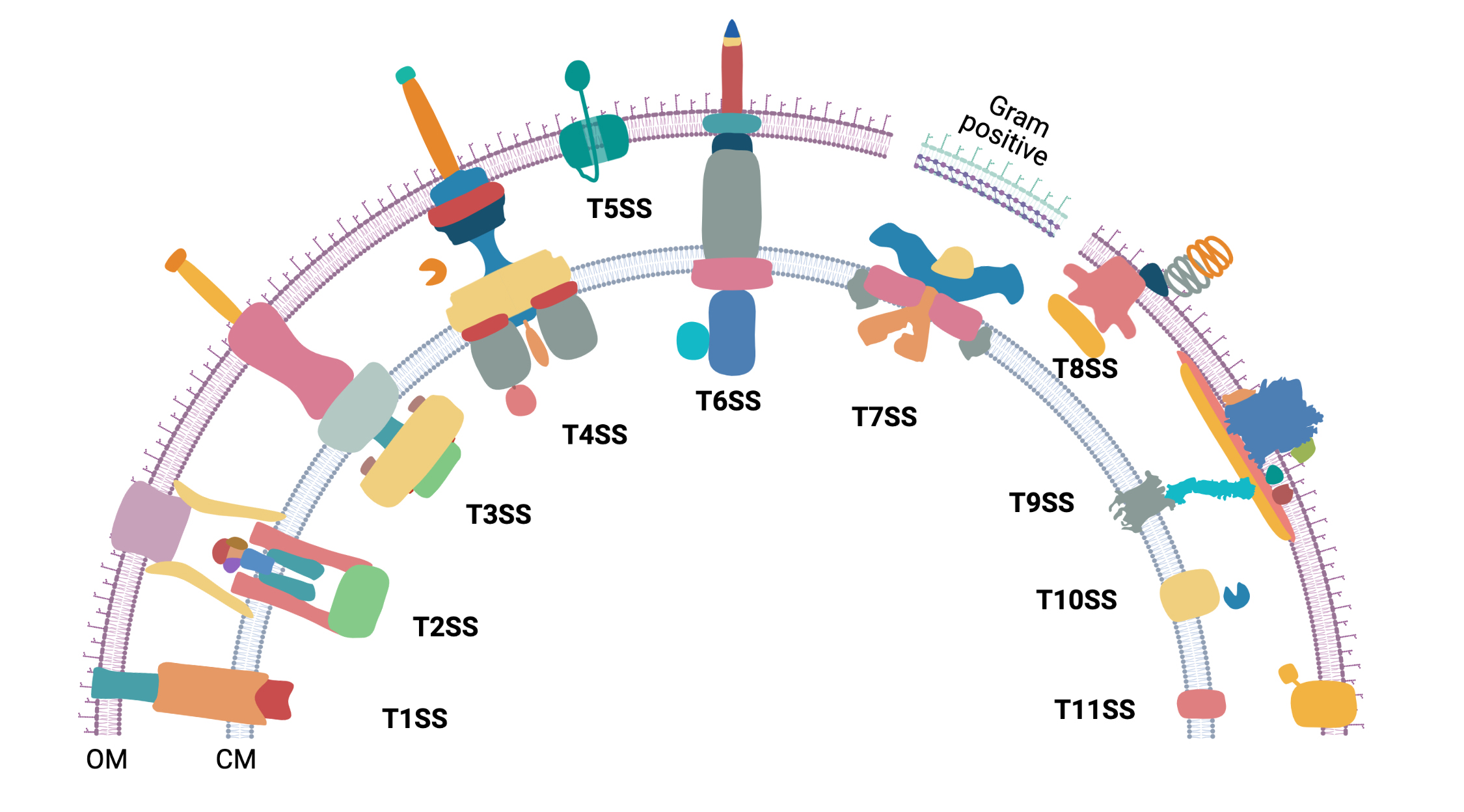
An illustration of the various types of secretion systems that are used in bacteria.

Bacterial secretion systems come in several different varieties. These are intricate complexes of proteins that are incorporated within the membranes of many different species of bacteria. These proteins are used by the bacteria to expel and transport intracellular enzymes, proteins, and molecules across the cytoplasmic membrane into a host cell or into the surrounding extracellular space. The type of secretion system used is dependent upon the function required and the type of cell that is utilizing it. A gram-negative, pathogenic diderm might employ a secretion system's membrane bound proteins to inject toxins into the host cell, while that of a Type IX Secretion System (T9SS) may only be used to secrete proteins into the extracellular space.

== Discovery and epidemiology ==
Various components of this system had been previously discovered as early as 2005. Namely, PorT and its ability to transport Gingipains in then-novel organisms Flavobacterium johnsoniae and Porphyromonas gingivalis. These components eventually led to the differentiation of the T9SS, setting it apart from the others. Through the conglomeration of other research done on these two novel organisms, specific proteins were identified in patterns as being used for similar functions across Bacteroidetes. GldK, GldL, GldM, and GldN proteins were observed in F. johnsoniae to be necessary for the cells to have motility and the ability to use chitin. And protease transportation was only enabled in P. gingivalis specimens if PorT, PorL, PorM, PorN, PorK, SprA/Sov proteins were present and functional within the cell. A later discovery that PorT was also necessary for the membrane facilitation of chitinase in F. johnsoniae led to the subsequent observation that the aforementioned list of proteins made up an entirely unique secretion system.

Formerly known as Porphyromonas secretion systems (PorSS), due to its discovery on Porphyromonas gingivalis, Type IX Secretion Systems were officially recognized and renamed in 2010 as the ninth secretion system by research groups that were headed by M.J. McBride and K. Nakayama. These research groups found that Type IX secretion systems are exclusive to the phylum of Bacteroidetes and that they are present within a majority of species within that phylum. Further research that was carried out by S.S. Abby found that about 62% of members from the phylum Bacteroidetes contain the T9SS.

The only phylum of bacteria to house a T9SS, Bacteroidetes are largely found throughout the gastrointestinal tracts of mammals. While there presence is stronger within fecal material, as much as 20% of all bacteria present within the oral cavities of mammals can belong to the phylum Bacteroidetes. Though mammals house a strong presence of these T9SS bacteria, Bacteroidetes can also be found within echinoderm, arthropod, and avian species. This illustrates that the presence of T9SS is relatively widespread.

== Evolutionary relationship ==
The type IX secretion system likely evolved from ancient protein transport systems adapted to gliding motility and environmental interactions in Bacteroidetes. Genomic studies suggest that components of T9SS may have evolved in parallel with those of the type VI Secretion System (T6SS), sharing structural and energy-transducing similarities. Unlike injectisome-type systems, T9SS developed primarily for secretion into the extracellular environment rather than into host cells, supporting its unique ecological roles.

== Composition and function ==
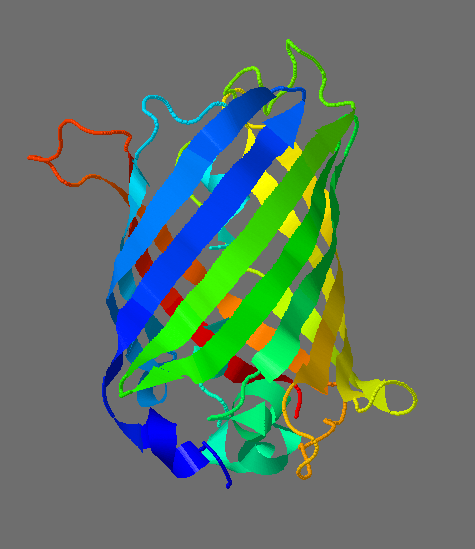
This illustrates the basic structure of Por proteins, a β-barrel.

The Type IX bacterial secretion system contains 18 genes that are needed for proper function. There are many genes in the P. gingivalis genome that code for specific parts of the secretion system that are found in various areas, while the genes PorK-PorL-PorM-PorN-PorP are transcribed together.

=== There are three sub-complexes found within the secretion system ===
1. PorLM and GldLM rotary motor
2. PorKN and GldKN which associate with the outer membrane
3. Soc and SprA translocon

Other subunits include GldO, GldJ, β-barrel, and plug proteins.

==== Rotary motor ====
- PorL, PorM, GldL, GldM
- Function: Generates energy using the proton motive force (PMF)

==== Outer membrane scaffold ====
- PorK, PorN, GldK, GldN
- Function: Structural support and protein recruitment

==== Translocon ====
- SprA, Sov, Soc
- Function: Moves proteins across the outer membrane

==== Accessory proteins ====
- GldO, GldJ, plug proteins
- Function: Help stabilize and regulate the system

==== Mechanism of energy utilization ====
The PorLM/GldLM motor uses the proton motive force (PMF) across the inner membrane to power movement. GldL and GldM form a proton channel. As protons flow through, this generates torque that moves proteins like SprA through the outer membrane. This process supports secretion of enzymes like chitinases and proteases and helps build biofilms, especially in bacteria like Flavobacterium johnsoniae and Porphyromonas gingivalis.

=== Structural studies ===
Advances in cryo-electron microscopy have resolved the ring-like architecture of PorK and PorN complexes, revealing a periplasmic channel that aligns with the outer membrane translocon. These structures highlight the modularity and coordination of energy use and substrate specificity across the system. A 2025 cyro-EM work shows the PorKN ring in higher resolution. This work combines the use of cyro-EM and AlphaFold-predicted structures.

== Utility ==
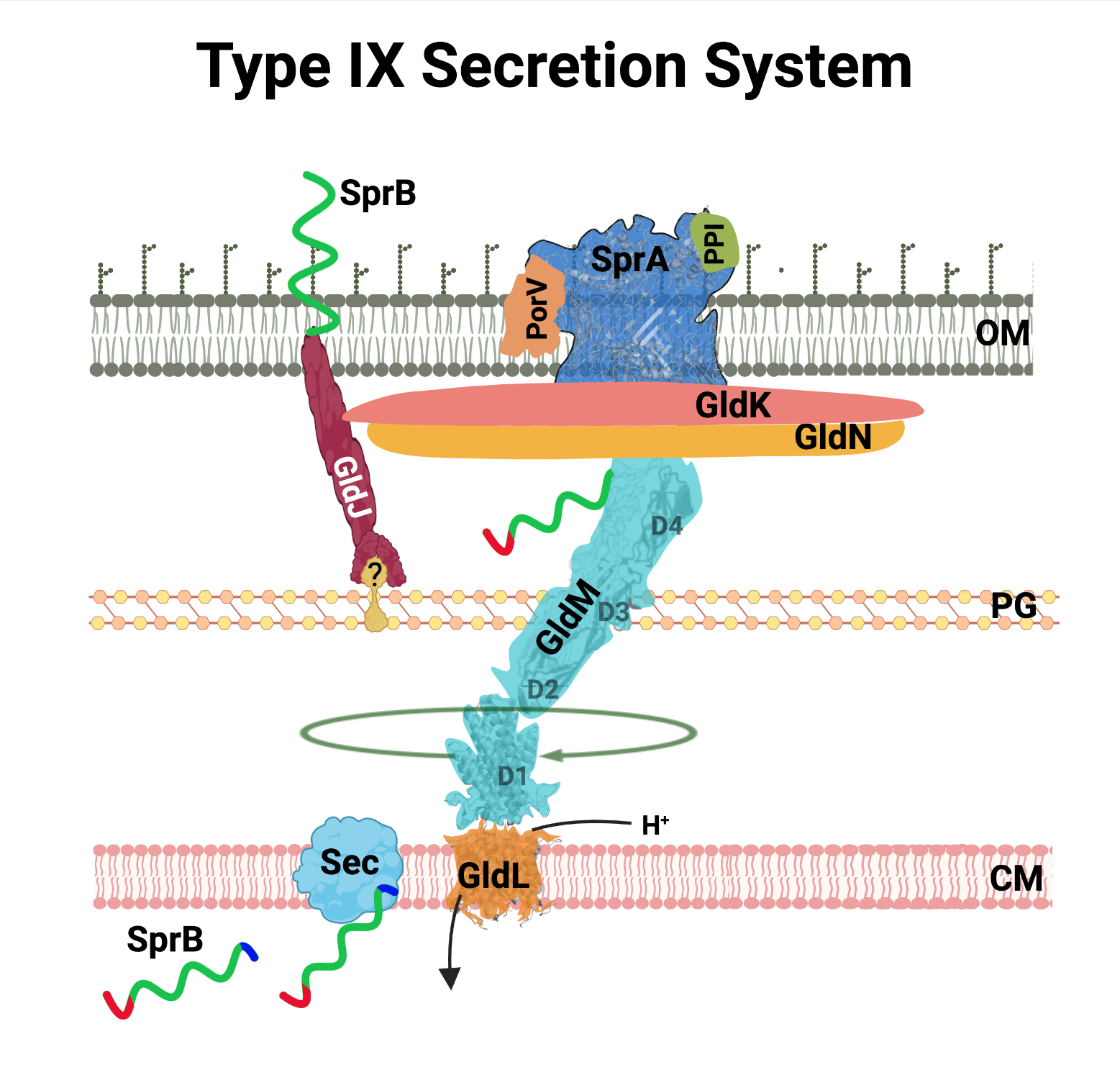
A closer illustration of the T9SS of a diderm bacterial cell.

Rotation of the T9SS can be used to enable motility for the cell in the form of gliding motility. It can also be used to secrete a variety of proteins into the extracellular environment. These secreted proteins include: virulence factors, adhesins, protective surface proteins, cargo proteins, and enzymes such as hydrolytic enzymes, cellulases, chitinases, and proteases, each of which vary in utility for the cell.

Secreted virulence factors are used as a coating for the cell and the cargo vesicles that it releases. This coating allows these packaged vesicles to enter into a host cell and impair immune response in the host. Virulence factors on vesicles contribute to immune evasion but may also trigger inflammatory responses in host tissues.

Adhesins act to fasten the cell to other cells and to ensure that it can dock and lock onto other surfaces that would be more beneficial for the cell's survival. These secreted adhesins help to establish biofilms around the cells which contribute to resisting external distress and an increase in cellular resilience to the environment.

The enzymes that can be secreted are used for the breakdown of extracellular molecules for the acquisition of nutrients from the environment, or for protection by cleaving complement plasma proteins or peptides found in the environment. T9SS also helps non-pathogenic bacteria survive in nature. In marine species, it supports the breakdown of seaweed and contributes to nutrient recycling and carbon cycling. T9SS is not just important for infections. It plays a key role in the environment, especially in marine bacteria that use it to break down complex carbohydrates like chitin and cellulose. This helps recycle nutrients in aquatic ecosystems.

Researchers are also studying T9SS for industrial uses, including enzyme production, wastewater treatment, and converting plant material into energy. Its unique secretion mechanism may be useful for future biotechnological applications.

== Medical significance ==
T9SS is used by a bacteria for the release of a diverse array of proteins including virulence factors that can add to the bacterial pathogenicity. Some of the main pathogens are referred to as gingipains and are Kgp, RgpA, and RgpB. Gingipains are virulence factors that cause around 85% of protein degradation or proteolysis, greatly contributing to inflammatory conditions and the destruction of periodontal tissue. The T9SS also can be a major component to motility for various bacterial systems. The proteins that make up this externally assembled rotary system can be recognized, much like other pathogen-associated molecular patterns (PAMPs), by a host's innate immune system, resulting in complement cascades. These plasma proteins meet the enzymatic T9SS cargo proteins and become susceptible to degradation.

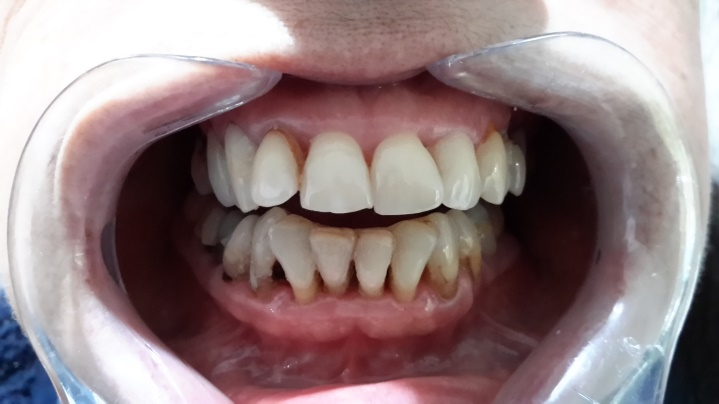
An instance of periodontitis that illustrates inflamed and receding gingiva and the appearance of gaps forming between the teeth.

Porphyromonas peptidyl arginine deiminase (PPAD) is an enzyme that was additionally discovered to strictly be used with a T9SS in P. gingivalis that breaks down and alters protein structures by converting any arginine residues within the proteins into a neutrally charged citrulline. Secretion of PPADs can contribute to various deregulatory and inflammatory diseases. Periodontitis and rheumatoid arthritis (RA) are among the more common diseases that PPAD can contribute to, other diseases include psoriasis, multiple sclerosis (MS), Alzheimer's, and even some forms of cancer.

Therapeutic treatments for bacteria with T9SS release include the administration of proper antibiotics, which can also target the proteolytic enzymes that T9SSs secrete. Cranberry and rice extracts were also seen to have a degree of success with inhibiting the activity of gingipains and in preventing pathogenic biofilm formations and growth.
