= Streptococcus gordonii =

Scientific classification
- Domain: Bacteria
- Kingdom: Bacillati
- Phylum: Bacillota
- Class: Bacilli
- Order: Lactobacillales
- Family: Streptococcaceae
- Genus: Streptococcus
- Species: S. gordonii

Binomial name
- Streptococcus gordonii Kilian et al. 1989

Species of bacterium

Streptococcus gordonii is a Gram-positive bacterium included among some of the initial colonizers of the periodontal environment. The organism, along with related oral streptococci, has a high affinity for molecules in the salivary pellicle (or coating) on tooth surfaces. S. gordonii therefore can rapidly colonize clean tooth surfaces, and S. gordonii along with related organisms comprise a high percentage, up to 70%, of the bacterial biofilm that forms on clean tooth surfaces. Generally harmless in the mouth, S. gordonii can cause acute bacterial endocarditis upon gaining access systemically. S. gordonii also forms an attachment substratum for later colonizers of tooth surface and can modulate the pathogenicity of these secondary colonizers through interspecies communication mechanisms.

The whole genome sequence of S. gordonii CCUG 33482 type strain was deposited and published in DNA Data Bank of Japan, European Nucleotide Archive and GenBank in 2016 under the accession number LQWV00000000.

== DNA repair ==
Upon systemic infection, S. gordonii is subjected to conditions in human blood that damage its DNA. However, DNA damage can be tolerated by the use of DNA repair processes. The S. gordonii genome encodes a two protein complex, RexAB, that is employed in recombinational repair and can promote survival by repairing DNA double-strand breaks.
