= Porphyromonas pasteri =

Scientific classification
- Domain: Bacteria
- Kingdom: Pseudomonadati
- Phylum: Bacteroidota
- Class: Bacteroidia
- Order: Bacteroidales
- Family: Porphyromonadaceae
- Genus: Porphyromonas
- Species: P. pasteri

Binomial name
- Porphyromonas pasteri Sakamoto et al. 2015

Type strain
- CCUG 66735, JCM 30531, KUFDS01

Species of bacterium

Porphyromonas pasteri is a Gram-negative, obligately anaerobic, non-spore-forming and non-motile bacterium from the genus Porphyromonas which has been isolated from the human saliva. Porphyromonas pasteri is associated with periodontitis, a disease that can lead to tooth loss, and has also been linked to other systemic diseases such as cardiovascular disease, rheumatoid arthritis, and certain cancers.
