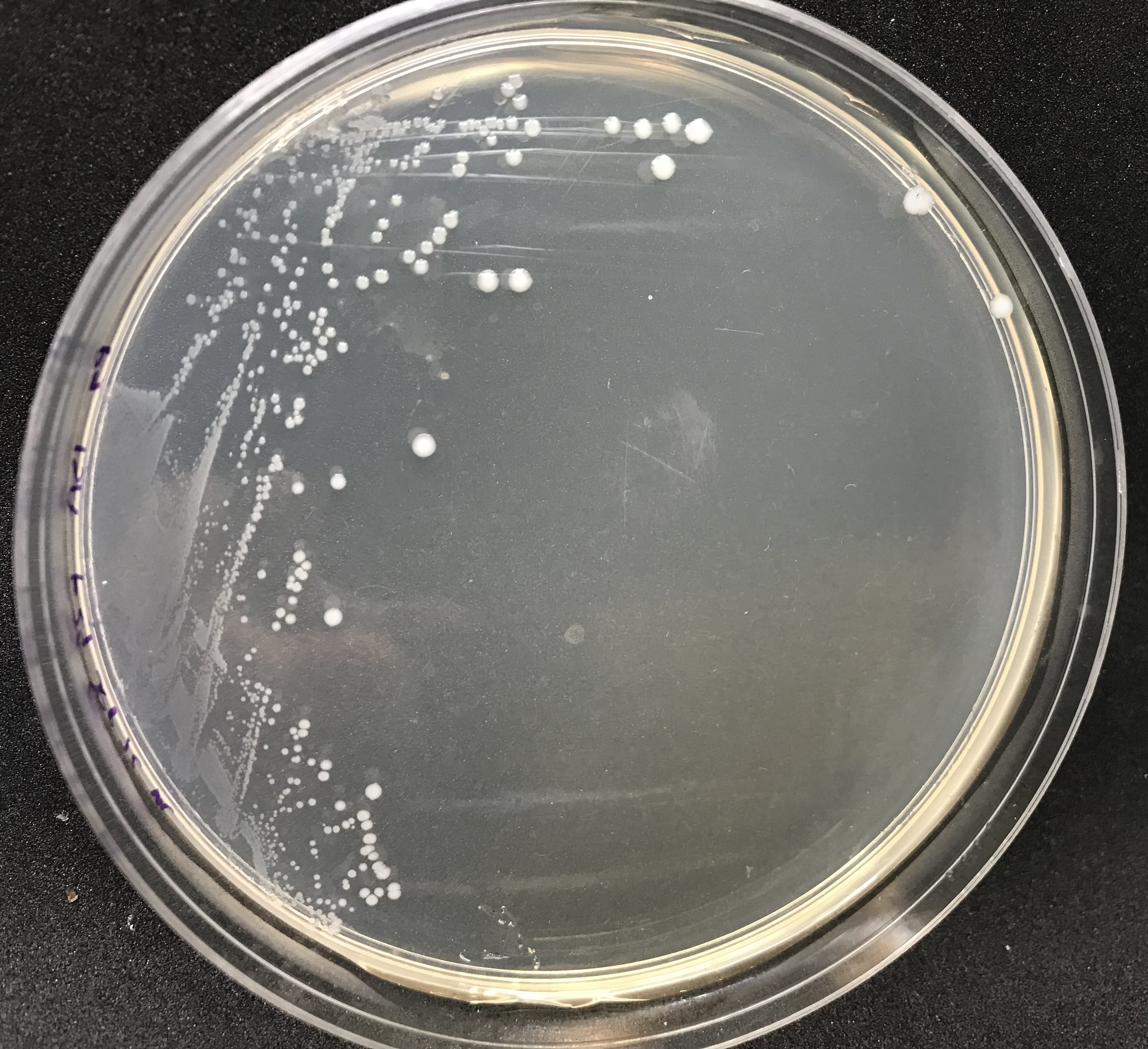
- Colonies of Porphyromonas gulae growing on a TSA plate

Scientific classification
- Domain: Bacteria
- Kingdom: Pseudomonadati
- Phylum: Bacteroidota
- Class: Bacteroidia
- Order: Bacteroidales
- Family: Porphyromonadaceae
- Genus: Porphyromonas
- Species: P. gulae

Binomial name
- Porphyromonas gulae Founier et al. 2001

Type strain
- ATCC 51700, CCUG 47701, DSM 15663, JCM 13865, Loup 1, NCTC 13180

= Porphyromonas gulae =

Species of bacterium

Porphyromonas gulae is a Gram-negative, anaerobic, non-spore-forming, rod-shaped and non-motile bacterium from the genus Porphyromonas which has been isolated from the gingival sulcus of a wolf in Canada.
