= Falsiporphyromonas =

Scientific classification
- Domain: Bacteria
- Kingdom: Pseudomonadati
- Phylum: Bacteroidota
- Class: Bacteroidia
- Order: Bacteroidales
- Family: Porphyromonadaceae
- Genus: Falsiporphyromonas; Wagener et al. 2014

Type species
- Falsiporphyromonas endometrii

Species
- F. endometrii

Genus of bacteria

Falsiporphyromonas is a genus from the family of Porphyromonadaceae, with one known species (Falsiporphyromonas endometrii).
