= Walter Goad =

American geneticist

Walter Goad (1925–2000) was a nuclear physicist at the Los Alamos National Laboratory. During the 1960s, Goad turned his attention from physics to biology and he is best known for his contributions to the founding of GenBank, the most widely used repository for DNA sequence data.

== Early life and education ==
Goad was born to working class parents in Marlow, Georgia, in 1925. Growing up during the Depression, his family moved frequently in search of work. When he was twelve years old, Goad began to work for a radio repairman and soon after obtained the qualification to work as an engineer at a local radio station.

In 1941, Goad moved from the South to Schenectady, New York, to take up a job at new radio station. The owner of the station sponsored Goad to attend Union College where he studied physics and also enrolled in the V-12 Navy College Training Program.

Graduating in the spring of 1945, Goad was assigned to a Navy ship in Manila just as World War II was coming to an end. On his discharge in June 1946, Goad began graduate studies in the physics department at the University of California at Berkeley. The following year he transferred to Duke University where he began to work on a PhD in cosmic ray physics under the supervision of Lothar Nordheim.

== Career ==
=== Work on the hydrogen bomb ===
In 1950, Nordheim was invited to come to Los Alamos to contribute to ongoing work on the hydrogen bomb. As Nordheim's student, Goad accompanied him. Although Goad was ostensibly at Los Alamos to finish his thesis on cosmic rays, he soon became involved in the hydrogen bomb work, making some important contributions.

After the successful test of the hydrogen bomb in 1952, Goad returned to his thesis work, obtaining his PhD in 1953. In the 1950s, Goad continued to work on problems related to nuclear physics and nuclear weapons; he would remain at Los Alamos for the rest of his career.

=== Biology ===
In the 1960s, Goad developed an increasing interest in problems in biology, especially in the field of molecular biology. To develop his interest, in 1964–65 Goad spent a sabbatical year at the University of Colorado Medical Center in Denver. There he began to work on some problems in biology, especially in collaboration with the physical chemist John Cann.

By the early 1970s, Goad was spending almost all of his time working on biological, rather than physics, problems. In 1974, Goad became a key member of the newly established T-10 Group (Theoretical Biology and Biophysics) at Los Alamos.

=== GenBank ===
During the 1970s, the T-10 group became especially interested in protein and nucleotide sequences. A significant quantity of such sequences were only just beginning to become available at this time. Goad assembled a group of young physicists – including Temple Smith, Myron Stein, Mike Waterman, William Beyer, and Minoru Kanehisa – to work on mathematical problems involved with sequence comparison and analysis. As part of this effort, in 1979 Goad established the Los Alamos Sequence Database to collect nucleotide sequences that could be used for analysis.

The Los Alamos Sequence Database was intended to be a pilot project. Goad solicited the National Institutes of Health for funds to set up a larger and more permanent sequence database. In 1981, the National Institutes of Health issued a competitive request for proposals to establish such a data bank. In 1982, a 5-year $2 million contract to establish and operate the GenBank database was awarded to Goad and his co-workers at Los Alamos (working jointly with Bolt, Beranek, and Newman). Goad's team at Los Alamos ran GenBank between 1982 and 1987.
