= EzTaxon Database =

In bioinformatics, the EzTaxon database is a web-based tool for the identification of prokaryotes based on 16S ribosomal RNA gene sequences. EzTaxon is an open access database that is produced and maintained by ChunLab, Inc.

The EzTaxon database contains sequences of type strains of prokaryotic species with validly published names. Although EzTaxon is mainly used for the routine identification of prokaryotic isolates, sequences from uncultured taxa were not included. Thus in 2012, EzTaxon was extended to include uncultured prokaryotes and the name of the database was changed to EzTaxon-e.

As of 2026, EzTaxon and EzTaxon-e had been discontinued as separate tools, with their database being included in EzBioCloud alongside the EzGenome database.

== Naming convention ==
Taxa names included in EzTaxon-e represent groups of uncultured sequences found in public domain databases. The names included in EzTaxon-e have no standing in formal nomenclature but they were created to help in the comparison of microbial communities and diversity in nature.

- New names found in EzTaxon-e are formed by adding special suffixes to Genbank sequence accession numbers of sequences (e.g. AB177171_s -> species of which the sequence entry AB177171 serves type; AB177171_g -> genus; AB177171_f -> family; AB177171_o -> order; AB177171_c -> class; AB177171_p -> phylum).
- Well-known names have been preserved for historical reasons. SAR11, the famous marine inhabitant, is labeled as SAR11(order), and further divided into 4 families (SAR11-1_f to SAR11-4_f).
- Based on 16S rRNA sequence phylogeny, some obviously misclassified species have been renamed using special suffixes. For example, Bacteroides pectinophilus is not an authentic member of the genus Bacteroides. However, it may represent a novel genus in the family Lachnospiraceae. Therefore, in the EzTaxon-e database, Bacteroides pectinophilus is placed under a tentatively named new genus Bacteroides_g1.
- Sequences and tentative taxa that start with "4P" are products of the Roche 454 GS FLX Titanium system.
