= Gingipain K =

Class of enzymes

Identifiers
- EC no.: 3.4.22.47
- CAS no.: 159745-69-4

Databases
- IntEnz: IntEnz view
- BRENDA: BRENDA entry
- ExPASy: NiceZyme view
- KEGG: KEGG entry
- MetaCyc: metabolic pathway
- PRIAM: profile
- PDB structures: RCSB PDB PDBe PDBsum
Search
- PMC: articles
- PubMed: articles
- NCBI: proteins

Gingipain K (EC 3.4.22.47, Lys-gingipain, PrtP proteinase) is an enzyme. This enzyme catalyses the following chemical reaction:

Endopeptidase with strict specificity for lysyl bonds

Activity of this enzyme is stimulated by glycine.

== See also ==
- Gingipain
  - Gingipain R
