= Macellibacteroides =

Scientific classification
- Domain: Bacteria
- Kingdom: Pseudomonadati
- Phylum: Bacteroidota
- Class: Bacteroidia
- Order: Bacteroidales
- Family: Porphyromonadaceae
- Genus: Macellibacteroides; Jabari et al. 2012

Type species
- Macellibacteroides fermentans

Species
- M. fermentans

Genus of bacteria

Macellibacteroides is a genus from the family of Porphyromonadaceae, with one known species (Macellibacteroides fermentans).
