= Gingipain R =

Class of enzymes

Identifiers
- EC no.: 3.4.22.37
- CAS no.: 159745-71-8

Databases
- IntEnz: IntEnz view
- BRENDA: BRENDA entry
- ExPASy: NiceZyme view
- KEGG: KEGG entry
- MetaCyc: metabolic pathway
- PRIAM: profile
- PDB structures: RCSB PDB PDBe PDBsum
Search
- PMC: articles
- PubMed: articles
- NCBI: proteins

Gingipain R (EC 3.4.22.37, Arg-gingipain, gingipain-1, argingipain, Arg-gingivain-55 proteinase, Arg-gingivain-70 proteinase, Arg-gingivain-75 proteinase, arginine-specific cysteine protease, arginine-specific gingipain, arginine-specific gingivain, RGP-1, RGP) is an enzyme. This enzyme catalyses the following chemical reaction:

Hydrolysis of proteins and small molecule substrates, with a preference for Arg in P1 (position 1)

This enzyme is secreted cysteine endopeptidase from the bacterium Porphyromonas gingivalis.

== See also ==
- Gingipain
  - Gingipain K
