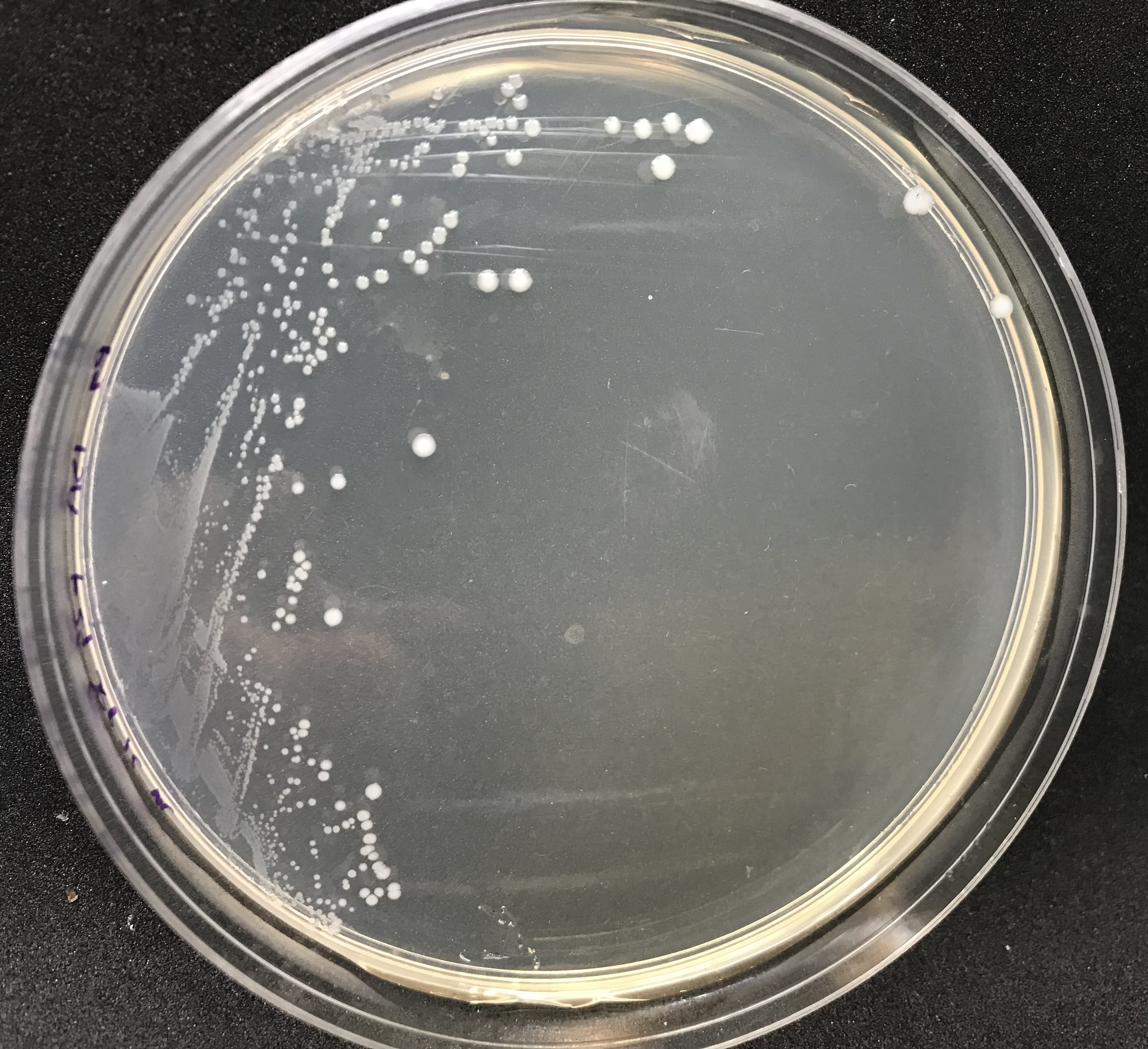
- Colonies of Porphyromonas gulae growing on a TSA plate

Scientific classification
- Domain: Bacteria
- Kingdom: Pseudomonadati
- Phylum: Bacteroidota
- Class: Bacteroidia
- Order: Bacteroidales
- Family: Porphyromonadaceae
- Genus: Porphyromonas; Shah and Collins 1988

Type species
- Porphyromonas asaccharolytica

Species
- P. asaccharolytica P. bennonis P. cangingivalis P. canoris P. catoniae P. circumdentaria P. crevioricanis P. endodontalis P. gingivalis P. gingivicanis P. gulae P. levii P. macacae P. pasteri P. pogonae P. somerae P. katsikii

Synonyms
- Oribaculum Moore and Moore 1994

= Porphyromonas =

Genus of bacteria

Porphyromonas is a Gram-negative, non-spore-forming, obligately anaerobic and non-motile genus from the family Porphyromonadaceae. There were 16 different Porphyromonas species documented as of 2015, which reside in both animal and human reservoirs. It was discovered more recently that Porphyromonas also exist in the environment, albeit to a lesser extent. This genus is notably implicated in the modulation of oral cavity, respiratory tract, and gastrointestinal tract disease states. It is suggested that Porphyromonas either operate as benign bacteria pertinent to host immunity or are potential pathobionts that opportunistically provoke diseased states when homeostasis is disrupted. Despite its characterization not being fully elucidated due to sparse research, various studies report the prevalence of this genus at 58.7% in healthy states compared with 41.3% in diseased states.

This genus was first reported in the oral cavity and is found specifically in the salivary microbiome. Porphyromonas are also commonly found in the microbiome of the human digestive tract, as shown by the Human Microbiome Project in general.

== Distribution of species ==
While overlap exists between humans and animals in the distribution of Porphyromonas species, some species are more prevalent in each.

=== Humans ===
P. asaccharolytica, P. endodontalis, P. gingivalis, P. catoniae, P. pasteri, P. somerae, and P. uenonis

=== Porphyromonas endodontalis in humans ===
- The gram-negative anaerobic bacterium Porphyromonas endodontalis is frequently linked to endodontic infections. The diagnosis, prevention, and treatment of conditions that affect the dental pulp—the soft tissue inside the tooth that contains nerves and blood vessels—are the focus of the dental specialty known as endodontics.
- Since its initial discovery in the 1990s in the infected root canals of human teeth, P. endodontalis has come to be known as a significant pathogen in endodontic infections. This bacterium belongs to the Porphyromonas genus, which also contains a number of other species linked to oral infections and periodontal disease.
- Because P. endodontalis is a facultative anaerobe, it can live in both oxygen-rich and oxygen-poor conditions. It is a rod-shaped bacteria that is not mobile and does not produce spores. P. endodontalis, like other gram-negative bacteria, has a lipopolysaccharide-containing outer membrane, which contains chemicals that might cause an inflammatory reaction in the host.
- The ability of P. endodontalis to create enzymes that break down the extracellular matrix of host tissues, including collagen and elastin, is one of the organism's primary virulence factors. By doing so, the bacterium can elude the host's immune system and infect the dental pulp more deeply. Additionally, P. endodontalis makes toxins that can harm host cells and cause inflammation.
- P. endodontalis has been linked to endodontic infections as well as other systemic illnesses such rheumatoid arthritis and cardiovascular disease. In the body, this bacterium can colonize other tissues after entering the bloodstream, where it may cause tissue damage and persistent inflammation.
- Microbial culture of infected dental tissue or root canal samples is frequently used in the diagnosis of P. endodontalis infection. The bacteria can be recognized by its distinctive biochemical characteristics, growth requirements, and appearance. The existence of P. endodontalis can also be verified and separated from related species using molecular methods like PCR and DNA sequencing.
- Root canal therapy, which entails removing the infected tooth pulp and filling the root canal with a biocompatible substance, is frequently used to treat P. endodontalis infections. Although there is some controversy regarding the effectiveness of antibiotic therapy for endodontic infections, antibiotics may also be used to manage the infection.
- The gram-negative anaerobic bacterium Porphyromonas endodontalis is linked to endodontic infections. This bacterium makes enzymes and poisons that enable it to avoid the immune system and ingest larger amounts of host tissue. Microbial culture and molecular methods are used to diagnose P. endodontalis infections, and antibiotics and root canal treatments are frequently used in treatment.

=== Animals ===
P. katsikii, P. cangingivalis, P. canoris, P. cansulsi, P. circumdentaria, P. crevioricanis, P. gingivicanis, P. salivosa, P. macacae, P. gulae, and P. levii Porphyromonas genus is commonly found in healthy stallion semen <(https://doi.org/10.1016/j.anireprosci.2020.106568)>

=== Environment ===
Porphyromonas have been isolated from manmade and naturally occurring environments. Most of these species have been detected in manmade environments, including transportation systems, healthcare settings, and indoor facilities; Porphyromonas persist in naturally occurring environments such as air, soil, seawater, freshwater, agricultural sites, and alpine meadows to a lesser extent. Furthermore, waste-management sites are a pertinent source of environment-dwelling species. Specific environmentally hosted strains have not been widely studied or identified.

== Health impacts ==
=== Oral cavity ===
- P. ginvigalis: a gram-negative anaerobe and pathological agent of periodontitis.
- P. endodontalis: Porphyromonas endodontalis is associated with endodontal infections. It has been isolated from infected dental root canals and submucous abscesses of endodontal origin. Dental root canal infections that had P. endodontalis present have been linked to acute infection symptoms. Periodontal pockets and oral mucosa may occasionally contain it.

=== Gastrointestinal tract ===
- Overabundance of this genus has been reported from the feces of patients diagnosed with colorectal cancer.

=== Respiratory tract ===
- Porphyromonas increase has been associated with pulmonary tuberculosis lesions.

=== Uterine tract ===
- P. levii: bacteria of high abundance in cows with uterine disease.

=== Other ===
Alterations in Porphyromonas abundance have also been associated with various cancers, autoimmune and neurodegenerative conditions, vaginal diseases, rheumatoid arthritis, and Sjogren's syndrome.

== Detection methods ==
Porphyromonas is most commonly detected via utilization of 16s rRNA sequencing techniques.
