= Microbacter =

Scientific classification
- Domain: Bacteria
- Kingdom: Pseudomonadati
- Phylum: Bacteroidota
- Class: Bacteroidia
- Order: Bacteroidales
- Family: Porphyromonadaceae
- Genus: Microbacter; Sánchez-Andrea et al. 2014

Type species
- Microbacter margulisiae

Species
- M. margulisiae

Genus of bacteria

Microbacter is a genus of bacteria from the family of Porphyromonadaceae, with one known species (Microbacter margulisiae).
