= Porphyromonas gingivalis =

Scientific classification
- Domain: Bacteria
- Kingdom: Pseudomonadati
- Phylum: Bacteroidota
- Class: Bacteroidia
- Order: Bacteroidales
- Family: Porphyromonadaceae
- Genus: Porphyromonas
- Species: P. gingivalis

Binomial name
- Porphyromonas gingivalis (Coykendall et al. 1980) Shah and Collins 1988

Species of bacterium

Porphyromonas gingivalis belongs to the phylum Bacteroidota and is a nonmotile, Gram-negative, rod-shaped, anaerobic, pathogenic bacterium. It forms black colonies on blood agar.

It is found in the oral cavity, where it is implicated in periodontal disease, as well as in the upper gastrointestinal tract, the respiratory tract, and the colon. It has been isolated from women with bacterial vaginosis.

Collagen degradation observed in chronic periodontal disease results in part from the collagenase enzymes of this species. It has been shown in an in vitro study that P. gingivalis can invade human gingival fibroblasts and can survive in the presence of antibiotics. P. gingivalis invades gingival epithelial cells in high numbers, in which case both bacteria and epithelial cells survive for extended periods of time. High levels of specific antibodies can be detected in patients harboring P. gingivalis.

P. gingivalis infection has been linked to Alzheimer's disease and rheumatoid arthritis. It contains the enzyme peptidyl-arginine deiminase, which is involved in citrullination. Patients with rheumatoid arthritis have increased incidence of periodontal disease; antibodies against the bacterium are significantly more common in these patients.

P. gingivalis is divided into K-serotypes based upon capsular antigenicity of the various types.

== Genome ==
The genome of P. gingivalis was described in 2003 revealing 1,990 open reading frames (i.e. protein-coding sequences), encoded by 2,343,479 bp, with an average G+C content of 48.3%. An estimated 463 genes are essential.

== Virulence factors ==
=== Gingipain ===
Arg-gingipain (Rgp) and lys-gingipain (Kgp) are endopeptidase enzymes secreted by P. gingivalis through a type IX secretion system (T9SS). These gingipains serve many functions for the organism, contributing to its survival and virulence.

Arg-gingipains have been found to play a key role in the collection of nutrients for P. gingivalis survival. Rgp degrades large peptides of the host organism to provide the bacterium with an abundant nitrogen and carbon source from human serum albumin. P. gingivalis can also degrade transferrin within host cells which provides the organism with an abundant iron source needed to perform multiple cellular functions.

The gingipains are also responsible for a number of necessary functions related to host invasion and colonization. Rgp gingipains are necessary for adhesion and invasion as they processed precursor proteins of long fimbriae. The P. gingivalis genes encoding RgpA, Kgp, and hemagglutinin A (HagA) were strongly expressed after incubation with T. denticola. The hemagglutinin adhesion domain-containing proteins act to increase adhesive capacities of P. gingivalis with other bacterial species. They are also associated with coordinating the integrity of the biofilm in the developing and maturation phase. Lys- gingipains (Kgp) can bind to immobilized matrix proteins fibrinogen and fibronectin and may have a role in host colonization.

Gingipains also have the ability to degrade multiple signals of the host immune response. They have the ability to cleave subclass 1 and 3 IgG antibodies as well as proinflammatory cytokines such as IL-1β, IL-2, IL-6, TNF-α and IL-8 in regions of high P. gingivalis concentration, impairing host immune response function. Rgp can inhibit IL-2 accumulation in T-cells, which enables it to evade the host adaptive immune response, by modulating T-cell communication and proliferation.

Gingipains are key factors in tissue damage symptoms of periodontitis, which results from the degradation of matrix metalloproteins, collagen, and fibronectin. Degradation of these substrates interferes with interactions between host cells and the extracellular matrix, therefore impeding wound healing and causing destruction of periodontal tissues. Rgp is responsible for eliciting the host inflammatory response via the p38α MAPK transduction pathway. This response likely contributes to the inflammatory nature of periodontitis and is involved in tissue and bone destruction.

Gingipains have been associated with Alzheimer's disease (AD). Gingipains were discovered from TMAs of patients exhibiting AD brain pathology. Both RgpB and Kgp were discovered from hippocampus and cerebral cortex of AD patients and were found to be associated with tau load, a marker for AD pathology and ubiquitin, which accumulates in tau tangles and amyloid beta plaques in AD brain. P. gingivalis 16S rRNA was also discovered in the cerebral cortex and csf of AD brains. Pretreatment with gingipain inhibitors protected neuron cell degradation caused by administration of gingipains in murine model.

=== Capsular polysaccharide ===
The encapsulated strain of P. gingivalis is much more virulent than the nonencapsulated strain in a mouse abscess model. The capsule is a capsular polysaccharide and when present down regulates cytokine production especially proinflammatory cytokines IL-1β, IL-6, IL-8, and TNF-α, indicating host evasion responses. However, other studies have found the capsular polysaccharide to elicit host immune responses like neutrophil migration and dose and time dependent expression of cell migration chemokines like MCP-1, KC, MIP-2 and RANTES in capsular polysaccharide-challenged murine peritoneal macrophages. These conditions are likely to contribute to the inflammatory lesions observed in periodontitis.

Vaccines made from capsular polysaccharide of P. gingivalis apparently impair oral bone loss in murine models. These vaccines have been able to elicit potent immune responses such as increased IgM and IgG responses that recognize whole P. gingivalis organisms.

=== Fimbriae ===
Fimbriae are appendages involved in cellular attachment and greatly contribute to virulence and are found on many Gram-negative and some Gram-positive bacteria.

P. gingivalis virulence is heavily associated with fimbriae as they have been characterized to be key factors in adhesion, invasion, and colonization. Fimbriae are also responsible for invasion of membrane vesicles into host cells. They were found to bind to cellular α5β1 integrins, which mediated adherence and impaired the homeostatic controls of host cells. Fimbriae were also found to be associated with modulating β2 integrin adhesive activity for uptake by monocytes using the CD14/TLR2/PI3K signaling complex, which may contribute to intracellular evasion tactics by P. gingivalis. P. gingivalis has long fimbriae, short fimbriae, and accessory components, each of which have distinct functions.

==== Long fimbriae ====
Long fimbriae (FimA), also known as major fimbriae, are long, peritrichous, filamentous components. They have a role in initial attachment and organization of biofilms, as they act as adhesins that mediate invasion and colonization of host cells contributing to P. gingivalis virulence.

==== Short fimbriae ====
Short fimbriae (Mfa1), also known as minor fimbriae, have distinct roles from long fimbriae and are characterized to be essential for cell-cell auto aggregation and recruitment for microcolony formation. Short fimbriae are involved in cell-cell adhesion with other dental commensals. It was found to coadhere and develop biofilm in conjunction with Streptococcus gordonii by interaction with SspB streptococcal surface polypeptide. This interaction may be essential in the invasion of dentinal tubules by P. gingivalis.

==== Accessory fimbriae ====
Fim C, D, and E accessory components associate with the main FimA protein and have a role in binding with matrix proteins and interaction with CXC-chemokine receptor 4 (CXCR4). Loss of function experiments have confirmed that P. gingivalis mutants deficient for Fim C, D, or E have drastically attenuated virulence.

=== Evasion of host defenses and immune responses ===
P. gingivalis has many ways of evading host immune responses, which heightens its virulence. It does this by using a combination of gingipain proteases, a capsular polysaccharide, induction of host cell proliferation, and the cleavage of chemokines responsible for neutrophil recruitment.

Virulent P. gingivalis further modulates leukocyte recruitment by proteolysis of cytokines and chemokines that are secreted by the host cells. The arg-gingipain and lys-gingipains are responsible for this proteolysis. In a study using a mouse model, P. gingivalis was specifically found to down-regulate IL-8 induction, causing delayed neutrophil recruitment. Prevention of neutrophil recruitment may inhibit the clearance of the bacterium from the site of infection allowing for colonization. P. gingivalis is able to evade opsonophagocytosis from granulocytes by using Gingipain K (Kgp) to cleave IgG 1 and 3. This further modulates immune response by impairing signaling. Other studies have found that P. gingivalis can subvert the complement pathway through C5αR and C3αR, which modulates the killing capacity of leukocytes, allowing for uncontrolled bacterial growth. P. gingivalis was also found to inhibit pro inflammatory and antimicrobial responses in human monocytes and mouse macrophages by fimbrial binding to CXCR4, inducing PKA signaling and inhibiting TLR-2-mediated immune response.

Once in the host cells, P. gingivalis is capable of inhibiting apoptosis by modulating the JAK/Stat pathway that controls mitochondrial apoptotic pathways. A proliferative phenotype may be beneficial to the bacterium as it provides nutrients, impairs host cell signaling, and compromises the integrity of the epithelial cell layer, allowing for invasion and colonization.

=== Ecology ===
P. gingivalis plays an important role in the onset of chronic adult periodontitis. Though it is found in low abundance in the oral cavity, it causes a microbial shift of the oral cavity, allowing for uncontrolled growth of the commensal microbial community. This leads to periodontitis through the disruption of the host tissue homeostasis and adaptive immune response. After using laser capture microdissection plus qRT-PCR to detect P. gingivalis in human biopsies, colocalization of P. gingivalis with CD4+ T cells was observed. However, the infection mechanism of T cells by P. gingivalis remains unknown.

P. gingivalis has been associated with increasing the virulence of other commensal bacteria in both in vivo and in vitro experiments. P. gingivalis outer membrane vesicles were found to be necessary for the invasion of epithelial cells of Tannerella forsythia. P. gingivalis short fimbriae were found to be necessary for coculture biofilm formation with Streptococcus gordonii. Interproximal and horizontal alveolar bone loss in mouse models are seen in coinfections involving P. gingivalis and Treponema denticola. The role of P. gingivalis in periodontitis is studied using specific pathogen-free mouse models of periodontal infections. In these models, P. gingivalis inoculation causes significant bone loss, which is a significant characteristic of the disease. In contrast, germ free mice inoculated with a P. gingivalis monoinfection incur no bone loss, indicating that P. gingivalis alone cannot induce periodontitis.

=== Pathogenesis and Cardiovascular Comorbidities ===
While P. gingivalis is a part of the typical microbiotic ecosystem of the oral cavity in humans, it can also become pathogenic if provided with sufficient opportunity. When this occurs, the resultant infection is known as gingivitis or periodontitis.

Periodontal disease, which is an infection of the gum tissue driven primarily by P. gingivalis, has been theorized to be linked with other systemic diseases, including Alzheimer's, atherosclerosis and other cardiovascular diseases. Though there exists no scientific consensus on the mechanism by which these disease processes are linked, evidence for the connection between periodontal disease and cardiovascular diseases including atherosclerosis has been found in both statistical study of human populations, and in vivo studies using a mouse model.

It is thought that periodontitis is linked to cardiovascular disease due to inflammation pathways, which the two pathologies have in common. The inflammation pathway of periodontitis is such that as the infection grows, bacteria, including P. gingivalis are targeted by neutrophils and natural killer immune cells. These cells phagocytize the bacteria, while simultaneously cytokine molecules in the area lead to a proinflammatory environment. This proinflammatory environment is also rich in intercellular signaling molecules including tumor necrosis factor-alpha, interleukins (interleukin 1, interleukin 4, interleukin 10), interferons and transforming growth factor beta. These molecules recruit more enzymes and transcription factors, which then in turn recruit more immune cells, forming a positive feedback loop which can make the immune response, and therefore the inflammation become chronic and systemic. Chronic inflammation of gum tissue can lead to a loss of this tissue and of bone tissue as well. The inflammation upregulates production of RANKL, an intercellular signaling molecule that promotes bone tissue dissolution, leading to a gradual loss of bony tissue. P. gingivalis infection is also thought to lead to oxidative stress. Both chronic systemic inflammation and oxidative stress are factors associated with the onset of cardiovascular disease, and are proposed mechanisms by which periodontal disease may, if it indeed is causationally linked to cardiovascular disease, accelerate the disease process of a cardiovascular disease.

While invasive P. gingivalis is associated with various forms of cardiovascular disease, including stroke, coronary artery disease, atrial fibrillation, and heart failure, the best evidence of a direct causational link is between invasive P. gingivalis (periodontal disease) and atherosclerosis. In vivo and in vitro animal models have found that the fimbriae of P. gingivalis promote host cell entry and atherothrombotic lesion formation once the bacteria enter the bloodstream, such as through lesions in the mouth. P. gingivalis has been shown to accelerate the atherosclerosis disease pathway in mice, as well as being found in human atherosclerotic plaque lesions.

== See also ==
- List of bacterial vaginosis microbiota
