= Lung cancer susceptibility =

Lung cancer susceptibility tests suggest the probability or susceptibility an individual may have of getting lung cancer. Lung cancer is a disease characterized by uncontrolled cell growth in the lung tissue. If left untreated, this growth can spread beyond the lungs in a process called metastasis, into nearby tissues or other parts of the body.

== Lung cancer and genetics ==
Lung cancer is one of the most lethal and common forms of cancer worldwide. Pollution, smoking (active and passive), radiation (in the form of x-rays or gamma rays) and asbestos are risk factors for lung cancer. Symptoms may include persistent cough, chest pain, coughing up blood, fatigue, and swelling of the neck and face. There are different types of lung cancers, which can metastasize. Treatments include chemotherapy, surgery, and radiation. The treatment aimed at killing the cancer can also eliminate functioning lung cells (leukocytes). Specific genetic factors can add to the risk of developing lung cancer. There are regions on chromosomes which are highly susceptible to mutation and, if present, increase the risk of developing lung cancer. These loci are the specific locations of a gene or a DNA sequence on a chromosome. Several loci are associated with an increased risk of developing lung cancer. Approximately 26 different genes can mutate into one type of lung cancer, known as carcinoma. An example is the MAP pathway, which is inhibited by ME (a lung cancer treatment). The risk of developing lung cancer is higher for those with a family history of the disease. A second way the risk could go up is if the individual lives with a smoker.

== Chromosomes involved ==
Many chromosomes are involved in the development of lung cancer, but those that greatly increase one's susceptibility to developing lung cancer are loci 15q25, 5p15, and 6p21. The locus 5p15 spans about 181 million base pairs on the short arm of chromosome 5, which is the largest chromosome. The locus 15q25 on chromosome 15 has genetic variants such as the CHRNA5-CHRNA3 locus, which also increases lung cancer susceptibility. Smoke is one of these risk factors: rs12914385, and rs8042374 are treated in cases where smoking is the known cause of lung cancer.

== Gene expression, carcinogenic mechanisms, susceptibility chromosomes ==
Abnormal gene expression in chromosome loci, such as 5p15 and 15q25, is strongly linked with the risk for developing lung cancer. Gene expression, or the "turning on" of the gene, can directly affect the chromosome by changing the coding system. The process of lung cancer development transforms healthy cells into cancer cells, which can then metastasize to different parts of the body.

== Susceptibility loci at chromosomes, disease markers and genes ==
In a large number of cases, the locus in chromosome region 15q25, which is strongly associated with lung cancer risk, was found to account for 14% (attributable risk) of lung cancer cases. Statistically similar risks were observed irrespective of smoking status or of one's propensity for smoking tobacco. The associated region contains several genes, including three that encode nicotinic acetylcholine receptor subunits (CHRNA5, CHRNA3, and CHRNB4). Such subunits are expressed in neurons and other tissues, in particular alveolar epithelial cells, pulmonary endocrine cells, and lung cancer cell lines, and they bind to N'-nitroglycerine and potential lung carcinogens. A non-synonymous variant of CHRNA5, which induces an amino acid substitution (D398N) at a highly conserved site in the second intracellular loop of the protein, is among the markers with the strongest disease associations.
