= Notifiable diseases in the United States =

Diseases which must be reported to American authorities

In the United States, the National Notifiable Disease Surveillance System (NNDSS) is responsible for sharing information regarding notifiable diseases. As of 2020, the following are the notifiable diseases in the US as mandated by the Centers for Disease Control and Prevention:

== Notifiable infectious diseases ==
- Anthrax
- Arboviral diseases, neuroinvasive and non-neuroinvasive
  - California serogroup virus diseases
  - Chikungunya virus disease
  - Eastern equine encephalitis virus disease
  - Powassan virus disease
  - Saint Louis encephalitis virus disease
  - West Nile virus disease
  - Western equine encephalitis virus disease
- Babesiosis
- Botulism
  - Botulism, foodborne
  - Botulism, infant
  - Botulism, wound
  - Botulism, other
- Brucellosis
- Campylobacteriosis
- Candida auris
- Carbapenemase Producing Carbapenem-Resistant Enterobacteriaceae (CP-CRE)
  - CP-CRE, Enterobacter spp.
  - CP-CRE, Escherichia coli (E. coli)
  - CP-CRE, Klebsiella spp.
- Chancroid
- Chlamydia trachomatis infection
- Cholera
- Coccidioidomycosis
- Congenital syphilis
- Syphilitic stillbirth
- Coronavirus disease 2019 (COVID-19)
- Cryptosporidiosis
- Cyclosporiasis
- Dengue virus infections
  - Dengue
  - Dengue-like illness
  - Severe dengue
- Diphtheria
- Ehrlichiosis and anaplasmosis
  - Anaplasma phagocytophilum infection
  - Ehrlichia chaffeensis infection
  - Ehrlichia ewingii infection
  - Undetermined human ehrlichiosis/anaplasmosis
- Giardiasis
- Gonorrhea
- Haemophilus influenzae, invasive disease
- Hansen's disease
- Hantavirus infection, non-Hantavirus pulmonary syndrome
- Hantavirus pulmonary syndrome
- Hemolytic uremic syndrome, post-diarrheal
- Hepatitis A, acute
- Hepatitis B, acute
- Hepatitis B, chronic
- Hepatitis B, perinatal virus infection
- Hepatitis C, acute
- Hepatitis C, chronic
- Hepatitis C, perinatal infection
- HIV infection
- Influenza-associated pediatric mortality
- Invasive pneumococcal disease
- Legionellosis
- Leptospirosis
- Listeriosis
- Lyme disease
- Malaria
- Measles
- Meningococcal disease
- Mumps
- Novel influenza A virus infections
- Pertussis
- Plague
- Poliomyelitis, paralytic
- Poliovirus infection, nonparalytic
- Psittacosis
- Q fever
  - Q fever, acute
  - Q fever, chronic
- Rabies, animal
- Rabies, human
- Rubella
  - Rubella, congenital syndrome
- Salmonella Paratyphi infection (Salmonella enterica serotypes Paratyphi A, B [tartrate negative], and C [S. Paratyphi])
- Salmonella Typhi infection (Salmonella enterica serotype Typhi)
- Salmonellosis
- Severe acute respiratory syndrome-associated coronavirus disease
- Shiga toxin-producing Escherichia coli
- Shigellosis
- Smallpox
- Spotted fever rickettsiosis
- Streptococcal toxic shock syndrome
- Syphilis
  - Syphilis, primary
  - Syphilis, secondary
  - Syphilis, early non-primary non-secondary
  - Syphilis, unknown or late
- Tetanus
- Toxic shock syndrome (other than streptococcal)
- Trichinellosis
- Tuberculosis
- Tularemia
- Vancomycin-intermediate Staphylococcus aureus and Vancomycin-resistant Staphylococcus aureus
- Varicella
- Varicella deaths
- Vibriosis
- Viral hemorrhagic fever
  - Crimean-Congo hemorrhagic fever virus
  - Ebola virus
  - Lassa virus
  - Lujo virus
  - Marburg virus
  - New World arenavirus – Guanarito virus
  - New World arenavirus – Junin virus
  - New World arenavirus – Machupo virus
  - New World arenavirus – Sabia virus
- Yellow fever
- Zika virus disease and Zika virus infection
  - Zika virus disease, congenital
  - Zika virus disease, non-congenital
  - Zika virus infection, congenital
  - Zika virus infection, non-congenital

== Notifiable non-infectious diseases ==
- Cancer
- Carbon monoxide poisoning
- Lead, elevated blood levels
  - Lead, elevated blood levels, children (<16 Years)
  - Lead, elevated blood levels, adult (≥16 Years)
- Pesticide-related illness and injury, acute
- Silicosis

== Notifiable outbreaks ==
1. Foodborne disease outbreak
2. Waterborne disease outbreak
