= Gingipain =

Protein family

Gingipains are a family of proteases secreted by Porphyromonas gingivalis. Among other functions, it works to degrade cytokines, thereby downregulating the host response in the form of reduced inflammation. Gingipain has been studied for its potential role in the development of Alzheimer's disease.

Atuzaginstat (COR388)—an experimental lysine-specific gingipain (Kgp) inhibitor formerly investigated in the treatment of Alzheimer's disease.

== See also ==
- Gingipain R
- Gingipain K
