= 16S ribosomal RNA =

RNA component

Bacterial small subunit ribosomal RNA
- SSU Ribosomal RNA, bacteria and archaea. From Woese 1987.

Identifiers
- Symbol: SSU_rRNA_bacteria
- Rfam: RF00177

Other data
- RNA type: Gene; rRNA
- Domain: Bacteria
- PDB structures: PDBe

Archaeal small subunit ribosomal RNA

Identifiers
- Symbol: SSU_rRNA_archaea
- Rfam: RF01959

Other data
- RNA type: Gene; rRNA
- Domain: Bacteria
- PDB structures: PDBe

Molecular structure of the 30S subunit from Thermus thermophilus. Proteins are shown in blue and the single RNA strand in a pale orange-brown colour.

16S ribosomal RNA (or 16S rRNA) is the RNA component of the 30S subunit of a prokaryotic ribosome (SSU rRNA). It binds to the Shine-Dalgarno sequence and provides most of the SSU structure.

The genes coding for it are referred to as 16S rRNA genes and are used in reconstructing phylogenies, due to the slow rates of evolution of this region of the gene. Carl Woese and George E. Fox were two of the people who pioneered the use of 16S rRNA in phylogenetics in 1977. Multiple sequences of the 16S rRNA gene can exist within a single bacterium.

== Terminology ==
The descriptor 16S refers to the size of these ribosomal subunits as reflected indirectly by the speed at which they sediment when samples are centrifuged. Thus 16S means 16 Svedberg units.

== Functions ==
- Like the large (23S) ribosomal RNA, it has a structural role, acting as a scaffold defining the positions of the ribosomal proteins.
- The 3′-end contains the anti-Shine-Dalgarno sequence, which binds upstream to the AUG start codon on the mRNA. The 3′-end of 16S RNA binds to the proteins S1 and S21 which are known to be involved in initiation of protein synthesis
- Interacts with 23S, aiding in the binding of the two ribosomal subunits (50S and 30S)
- Stabilizes correct codon-anticodon pairing in the A-site by forming a hydrogen bond between the N1 atom of adenine residues 1492 and 1493 and the 2′OH group of the mRNA backbone.

== Universal primers ==
The 16S rRNA gene is used for phylogenetic studies as it is highly conserved between different species of bacteria and archaea. Carl Woese pioneered this use of 16S rRNA in 1977. It is suggested that 16S rRNA gene can be used as a reliable molecular clock because 16S rRNA sequences from distantly related bacterial lineages are shown to have similar functionalities. Some thermophilic archaea (e.g. order Thermoproteales) contain 16S rRNA gene introns that are located in highly conserved regions and can impact the annealing of "universal" primers. Mitochondrial and chloroplastic rRNA are also amplified.

The most common primer pair was devised by Weisburg et al. (1991) and is currently referred to as 27F and 1492R; however, for some applications shorter amplicons may be necessary, for example for 454 sequencing with titanium chemistry the primer pair 27F-534R covering V1 to V3. Often 8F is used rather than 27F. The two primers are almost identical, but 27F has an M instead of a C. AGAGTTTGATCMTGGCTCAG compared with 8F.

Primer name	Sequence (5′–3′)	Ref.
8F	AGA GTT TGA TCC TGG CTC AG	
27F	AGA GTT TGA TCM TGG CTC AG	
336R	ACT GCT GCS YCC CGT AGG AGT CT	
337F	GAC TCC TAC GGG AGG CWG CAG	
518R	GTA TTA CCG CGG CTG CTG G	
533F	GTG CCA GCM GCC GCG GTA A	
785F	GGA TTA GAT ACC CTG GTA	
806R	GGA CTA CVS GGG TAT CTA AT	
907R	CCG TCA ATT CCT TTR AGT TT	
928F	TAA AAC TYA AAK GAA TTG ACG GG	
1100F	YAA CGA GCG CAA CCC	
1100R	GGG TTG CGC TCG TTG	
U1492R	GGT TAC CTT GTT ACG ACT T	
1492R	CGG TTA CCT TGT TAC GAC TT	

=== PCR and NGS applications ===
In addition to highly conserved primer binding sites, 16S rRNA gene sequences contain hypervariable regions that can provide species-specific signature sequences useful for identification of bacteria. As a result, 16S rRNA gene sequencing has become prevalent in medical microbiology as a rapid and cheap alternative to phenotypic methods of bacterial identification. Although it was originally used to identify bacteria, 16S sequencing was subsequently found to be capable of reclassifying bacteria into completely new species, or even genera. It has also been used to describe new species that have never been successfully cultured. With third-generation sequencing coming to many labs, simultaneous identification of thousands of 16S rRNA sequences is possible within hours, allowing metagenomic studies, for example of gut flora. In samples collected from patients with confirmed infections, 16S rRNA next-generation sequencing (NGS) demonstrated enhanced detection in 40% of cases compared to traditional culture methods; moreover, pre-sampling antibiotic consumption did not significantly affect the sensitivity of 16S NGS.

=== Hypervariable regions ===
The bacterial 16S gene contains nine hypervariable regions (V1–V9), ranging from about 30 to 100 base pairs long, that are involved in the secondary structure of the small ribosomal subunit. The degree of conservation varies widely between hypervariable regions, with more conserved regions correlating to higher-level taxonomy and less conserved regions to lower levels, such as genus and species. While the entire 16S sequence allows for comparison of all hypervariable regions, at approximately 1,500 base pairs long it can be prohibitively expensive for studies seeking to identify or characterize diverse bacterial communities. These studies commonly utilize the Illumina platform, which produces reads at rates 50-fold and 12,000-fold less expensive than 454 pyrosequencing and Sanger sequencing, respectively. While cheaper and allowing for deeper community coverage, Illumina sequencing only produces reads 75–250 base pairs long (up to 300 base pairs with Illumina MiSeq), and has no established protocol for reliably assembling the full gene in community samples. Full hypervariable regions can be assembled from a single Illumina run, however, making them ideal targets for the platform.

While 16S hypervariable regions can vary dramatically between bacteria, the 16S gene as a whole maintains greater length homogeneity than its eukaryotic counterpart (18S ribosomal RNA), which can make alignments easier. Additionally, the 16S gene contains highly conserved sequences between hypervariable regions, enabling the design of universal primers that can reliably produce the same sections of the 16S sequence across different taxa. Although no hypervariable region can accurately classify all bacteria from domain to species, some can reliably predict specific taxonomic levels. Many community studies select semi-conserved hypervariable regions like the V4 for this reason, as it can provide resolution at the phylum level as accurately as the full 16S gene. While lesser-conserved regions struggle to classify new species when higher order taxonomy is unknown, they are often used to detect the presence of specific pathogens. In one study by Chakravorty et al. in 2007, the authors characterized the V1–V8 regions of a variety of pathogens in order to determine which hypervariable regions would be most useful to include for disease-specific and broad assays. Amongst other findings, they noted that the V3 region was best at identifying the genus for all pathogens tested, and that V6 was the most accurate at differentiating species between all CDC-watched pathogens tested, including anthrax.

While 16S hypervariable region analysis is a powerful tool for bacterial taxonomic studies, it struggles to differentiate between closely related species. In the families Enterobacteriaceae, Clostridiaceae, and Peptostreptococcaceae, species can share up to 99% sequence similarity across the full 16S gene. As a result, the V4 sequences can differ by only a few nucleotides, leaving reference databases unable to reliably classify these bacteria at lower taxonomic levels. By limiting 16S analysis to select hypervariable regions, these studies can fail to observe differences in closely related taxa and group them into single taxonomic units, therefore underestimating the total diversity of the sample. Furthermore, bacterial genomes can house multiple 16S genes, with the V1, V2, and V6 regions containing the greatest intraspecies diversity. While not the most precise method of classifying bacterial species, analysis of the hypervariable regions remains one of the most useful tools available to bacterial community studies.

== Promiscuity of 16S rRNA genes ==
Under the assumption that evolution is driven by vertical transmission, 16S rRNA genes have long been believed to be species-specific, and infallible as genetic markers inferring phylogenetic relationships among prokaryotes. However, a growing number of observations suggest the occurrence of horizontal transfer of these genes. In addition to observations of natural occurrence, transferability of these genes is supported experimentally using a specialized Escherichia coli genetic system. Using a null mutant of E. coli as host, growth of the mutant strain was shown to be complemented by foreign 16S rRNA genes that were phylogenetically distinct from E. coli at the phylum level. Such functional compatibility was also seen in Thermus thermophilus. Furthermore, in T. thermophilus, both complete and partial gene transfer was observed. Partial transfer resulted in spontaneous generation of apparently random chimera between host and foreign bacterial genes. Thus, 16S rRNA genes may have evolved through multiple mechanisms, including vertical inheritance and horizontal gene transfer; the frequency of the latter may be much higher than previously thought.

== 16S ribosomal databases ==
The 16S rRNA gene is used as the standard for classification and identification of microbes, because it is present in most microbes and shows proper changes. Type strains of 16S rRNA gene sequences for most bacteria and archaea are available on public databases, such as NCBI. However, the quality of the sequences found on these databases is often not validated. Therefore, secondary databases that collect only 16S rRNA sequences are widely used.

=== SILVA ===
SILVA provides comprehensive, quality checked and regularly updated datasets of aligned small (16S/18S, SSU) and large subunit (23S/28S, LSU) ribosomal RNA (rRNA) sequences for all three domains of life as well as a suite of search, primer-design and alignment tools (Bacteria, Archaea and Eukarya).

=== GreenGenes ===
GreenGenes is a quality controlled, comprehensive 16S rRNA gene reference database and taxonomy based on a de novo phylogeny that provides standard operational taxonomic unit sets. In 2023, GreenGenes2 was released.

=== EzBioCloud ===
EzBioCloud database, formerly known as EzTaxon, consists of a complete hierarchical taxonomic system containing 62,988 bacteria and archaea species/phylotypes which includes 15,290 valid published names as of September 2018. Based on the phylogenetic relationship such as maximum-likelihood and OrthoANI, all species/subspecies are represented by at least one 16S rRNA gene sequence. The EzBioCloud database is systematically curated and updated regularly which also includes novel candidate species. Moreover, the website provides bioinformatics tools such as ANI calculator, ContEst16S and 16S rRNA DB for QIIME and Mothur pipeline.

=== MIMt ===
MIMt is a compact non-redundant 16S database for a rapid metagenomic samples identification. It is composed of 48,749 full 16S sequences belonging to 24,626 well classified bacteria and archaea species. All sequences were obtained from complete genomes deposited in NCBI and for each of the sequences full taxonomic hierarchy is provided. It contains no redundancy, so only one representative for each species was considered avoiding same sequences from different strains, isolates or pathovars resulting in a very fast tool for microorganisms identification, compatible with any classification software (QIIME, Mothur, DADA, etc).

=== Ribosomal Database Project ===
The Ribosomal Database Project (RDP) was a curated database that offers ribosome data along with related programs and services. The offerings included phylogenetically ordered alignments of ribosomal RNA (rRNA) sequences, derived phylogenetic trees, rRNA secondary structure diagrams and various software packages for handling, analyzing and displaying alignments and trees. Due to its large size the RDP database is often used as the basis for bioinformatic tool development and creating manually curated databases. The RDP server was taken offline in 2023, but the software is still available for download.
