= DNA Data Bank of Japan =

DNA sequence database

Content
- Description: Japanese DNA data bank
- Organisms: all

Contact
- Research center: International Nucleotide Sequence Database Collaboration; National Institute of Genetics
- Laboratory: Center for Information Biology and DNA Data Bank of Japan
- Primary citation: PMID 11752245
- Release date: 1786

Access
- Website: http://www.ddbj.nig.ac.jp

The DNA Data Bank of Japan (DDBJ) is a biological database that collects DNA sequences. It is located at the National Institute of Genetics (NIG) in the Shizuoka prefecture of Japan. It is also a member of the International Nucleotide Sequence Database Collaboration or INSDC. It exchanges its data with European Molecular Biology Laboratory at the European Bioinformatics Institute and with GenBank at the National Center for Biotechnology Information on a daily basis. Thus these three databanks contain the same data at any given time.

== History ==
DDBJ began data bank activities in 1987 at NIG and remains the only nucleotide sequence data bank in Asia.

== Organisation ==
Although DDBJ mainly receives its data from Japanese researchers, it can accept data from contributors from any other country. DDBJ is primarily funded by the Japanese Ministry of Education, Culture, Sports, Science and Technology (MEXT). DDBJ has an international advisory committee which consists of nine members, 3 members each from Europe, US, and Japan. This committee advises DDBJ about its maintenance, management and future plans once a year. Apart from this, DDBJ also has an international collaborative committee which advises on various technical issues related to international collaboration and consists of working-level participants.

== See also ==
- National Center for Biotechnology Information (NCBI)
- European Bioinformatics Institute (EBI)
