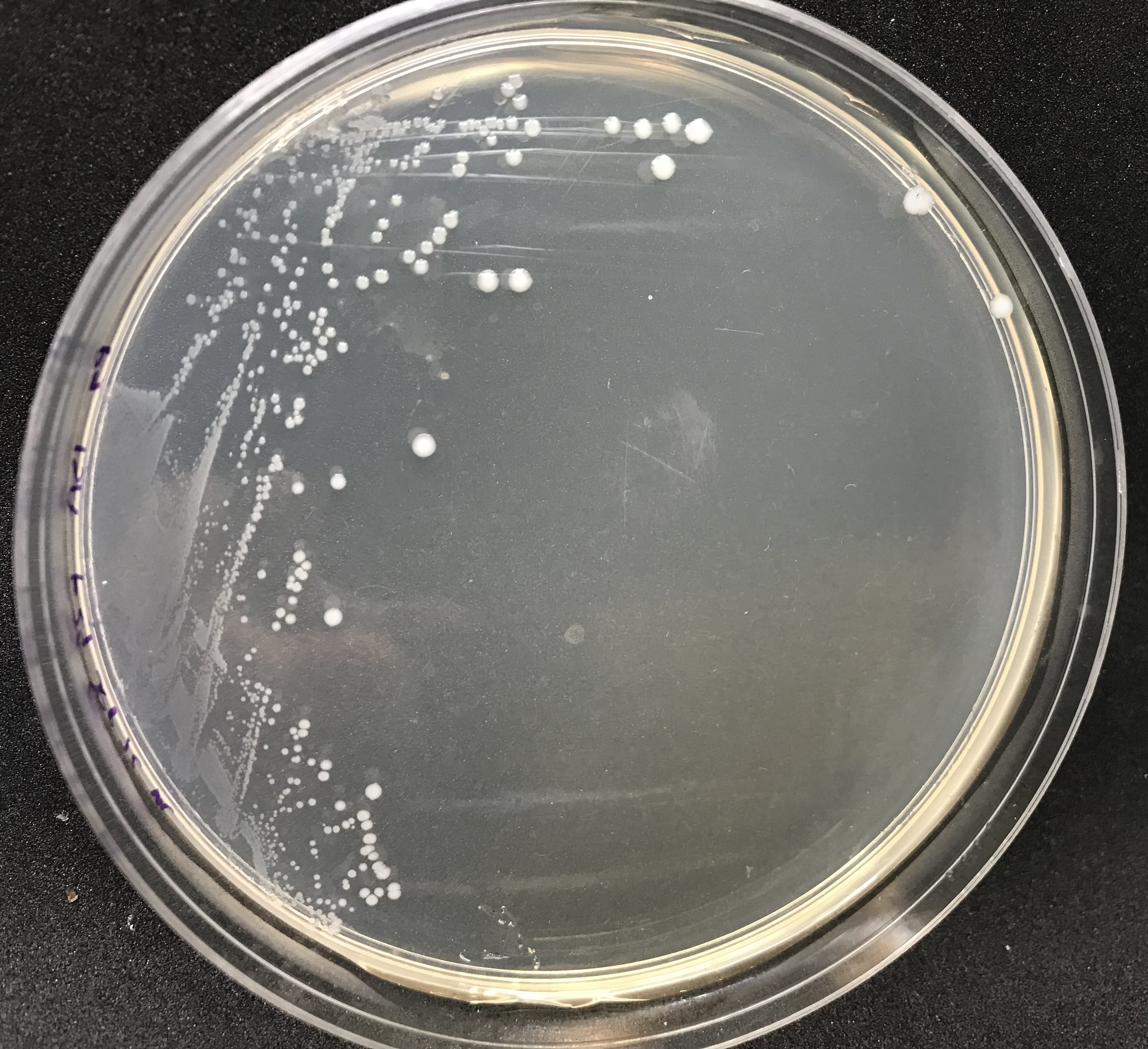
- Colonies of Porphyromonas gulae growing on a TSA plate

Scientific classification
- Domain: Bacteria
- Kingdom: Pseudomonadati
- Phylum: Bacteroidota
- Class: Bacteroidia
- Order: Bacteroidales
- Family: Porphyromonadaceae; Krieg 2012

Genera
- "Culturomica" Ndongo et al. 2016; Falsiporphyromonas Wagener et al. 2014; "Gabonia" Mourembou et al. 2016; "Ihubacter" Ndongo et al. 2016; "Lascolabacillus" Beye et al. 2016; Macellibacteroides Jabari et al. 2012; Microbacter Sánchez-Andrea et al. 2014; Porphyromonas Shah and Collins 1988; "Sanguibacteroides" Sydenham et al. 2015

= Porphyromonadaceae =

Family of bacteria

Porphyromonadaceae is a family of Gram-negative bacteria described by Noel R. Krieg in 2015. It contains nine genera, five of which are validly published by the International Code of Nomenclature of Prokaryotes. Bacteria with 16S ribosomal RNA highly similar to the Porphyromonas genus, as compared to the larger taxonomic order Bacteroidales, are classified in this family.

Bacteria of the Porphyromonadaceae family have coccobacilli shapes, and are obligately anaerobic, non-spore forming, and non-motile. Many of its species are members of animal gastrointestinal and oral microbiomes, such as Porphyromonas gingivalis, which causes periodontal disease.
