= List of biological databases =

Biological databases are stores of biological information. The journal Nucleic Acids Research regularly publishes special issues on biological databases and has a list of such databases. The 2018 issue has a list of about 180 such databases and updates to previously described databases. Omics Discovery Index can be used to browse and search several biological databases. Furthermore, the NIAID Data Ecosystem Discovery Portal developed by the National Institute of Allergy and Infectious Diseases (NIAID) enables searching across databases.

== Meta databases ==
Meta databases are databases of databases that collect data about data to generate new data. They are capable of merging information from different sources and making it available in a new and more convenient form, or with an emphasis on a particular disease or organism. Originally, metadata was only a common term referring simply to data about data such as tags, keywords, and markup headers.

- bio.tools: a community-driven registry of bioinformatics software and data resources
- ConsensusPathDB: a molecular functional interaction database, integrating information from 12 others
- Entrez search system at the National Center for Biotechnology Information (NCBI) link
- Expert Protein Analysis System (ExPASy) link
- Neuroscience Information Framework (University of California, San Diego): integrates hundreds of neuroscience relevant resources; many are listed below
- Resources at the Health Sciences Library System (HSLS) of the University of Pittsburgh
  - MolBio Information Service
    - OBRC: Online Bioinformatics Resources Collection
  - HSLS MolBio Available Software
  - Databases A-Z

== Model organism databases ==
Model organism databases provide in-depth biological data for intensively studied organisms.

- PomBase: the knowledgebase for the fission yeast Schizosaccharomyces pombe
- SubtiWiki: integrated database for the model bacterium Bacillus subtilis
- TAIR: the knowledgebase for the plant Arabidopsis thaliana

== Nucleic acid databases ==
=== DNA databases ===
The primary databases make up the International Nucleotide Sequence Database (INSD). The include:

- DNA Data Bank of Japan (National Institute of Genetics)
- EMBL (European Bioinformatics Institute)
- GenBank (National Center for Biotechnology Information)

DDBJ (Japan), GenBank (USA) and European Nucleotide Archive (Europe) are repositories for nucleotide sequence data from all organisms. All three accept nucleotide sequence submissions, and then exchange new and updated data on a daily basis to achieve optimal synchronisation between them. These three databases are primary databases, as they house original sequence data. They collaborate with Sequence Read Archive (SRA), which archives raw reads from high-throughput sequencing instruments.

Secondary databases are:

- HapMap
- OMIM (Online Mendelian Inheritance in Man): inherited diseases
- RefSeq
- 1000 Genomes Project: launched in January 2008. The genomes of more than a thousand anonymous participants from a number of different ethnic groups were analyzed and made publicly available.
- EggNOG Database: a hierarchical, functionally and phylogenetically annotated orthology resource based on 5090 organisms and 2502 viruses. It provides multiple sequence alignments and maximum-likelihood trees, as well as broad functional annotation.

Other databases

- Nucleosome positioning region database

=== Gene expression databases ===
Generic gene expression databases

Microarray gene expression databases

=== Genome databases ===
These databases collect genome sequences, annotate and analyze them, and provide public access. Some add curation of experimental literature to improve computed annotations. These databases may hold many species genomes, or a single model organism genome.

- ArrayExpress: archive of functional genomics data; stores data from high-throughput functional genomics experiments from EMBL
- Bioinformatic Harvester
- Cervical cancer gene database
- Ensembl: provides automatic annotation databases for human, mouse, other vertebrate and eukaryote genomes
- Ensembl Genomes: provides genome-scale data for bacteria, protists, fungi, plants and invertebrate metazoa, through a unified set of interactive and programmatic interfaces (using the Ensembl software platform)
- FlyBase: genome of the model organism Drosophila melanogaster
- Gene Disease Database
- Gene Expression Omnibus (GEO): a public functional genomics data repository from the U.S. National Cancer Institute (NCI), which supports array- and sequence-based data. Tools for querying and downloading gene expression profiles are provided.
- Human Protein Atlas (HPA): a public database with expression profiles of human protein coding genes both on mRNA and protein level in tissues, cells, subcellular compartments, and cancer tumors.
- Legume Information System (LIS): genomic database for the legume family
- National Genomic Research Library: A comprehensive whole-genome dataset for rare conditions and cancer maintained by Genomics England, in partnership with the NHS.
- Personal Genome Project: human genomes of 100,000 volunteers from around the world
- Phytozome: comparative genomics platform for sequenced plant genomes and green algae, maintained by the DOE Joint Genome Institute
- RGD (Rat Genome Database): genomic and phenotype data for Rattus norvegicus
- Saccharomyces Genome Database: genome of the yeast model organism
- SNPedia
- SoyBase Database (SoyBase): USDA soybean genetics and genomic database (Soybean)
- UCSC Malaria Genome Browser: genome of malaria causing species (Plasmodium falciparum and others)
- Wormbase: genome of the model organism Caenorhabditis elegans and WormBase ParaSite for parasitic species
- Xenbase: genome of the model organism Xenopus tropicalis and Xenopus laevis
- Zebrafish Information Network: genome of this fish model organism

=== Phenotype databases ===
- PHI-base: pathogen-host interaction database. It links gene information to phenotypic information from microbial pathogens on their hosts. Information is manually curated from peer-reviewed literature.
- RGD Rat Genome Database: genomic and phenotype data for Rattus norvegicus
- PomBase database: manually curated phenotypic data for the yeast Schizosaccharomyces pombe

=== RNA databases ===
- miRBase: the microRNA database
- PolymiRTS: a database of DNA variations in putative microRNA target sites
- PolyQ: database of polyglutamine repeats in disease and non-disease associated proteins
- Rfam: a database of RNA families
- IRESbase: A comprehensive database of experimentally validated internal ribosome entry sites.

== Amino acid and protein databases ==
(See also: List of proteins in the human body)

Several publicly available data repositories and resources have been developed to support and manage protein related information, biological knowledge discovery and data-driven hypothesis generation. The databases in the table below are selected from the databases listed in the Nucleic Acids Research (NAR) databases issues and database collection and the databases cross-referenced in the UniProtKB. Most of these databases are cross-referenced with UniProt / UniProtKB so that identifiers can be mapped to each other.

Proteins in human:

There are about ~20,000 protein coding genes in the standard human genome. (Roughly ~1200 already have Wikipedia articles - the Gene Wiki - about them) if we are Including splice variants, there could be as many as 500,000 unique human proteins

=== Different types of Protein databases ===
DB name	DB website	Provider	Data sources	Revenue/Sponsors sources	Integrates	Desc.	Size	DB type	Actively maintained
InterPro	InterPro	ELIXIR infrastructure	European Bioinformatics Institute	EMBL, The Welcome trust, BBSRC	CATH-Gene3D, CDD, HAMAP, MobiDB, PANTHER, Pfam, SMART, SUPERFAMILY, SFLD, TIGRFAMs,	classifies proteins into families and predicts the presence of domains and sites		Protein sequence databases	Yes
NeXtProt	NextProt	CALIPHO (is a group at the SIB)	Swiss Institute of Bioinformatics	Funding sources	UniProt, Cellosaurus, Gnomad, IntAct, SRAA Atlas, Uniprot - GOA, BGEE, COSMIC, MassIVE, Peptide atlas	a human protein-centric knowledge resource		Protein sequence databases	Yes
Wiki-Pi	Wiki-Pi	Madhavi K. Ganapathiraju					At present Wiki-Pi contains 48,419 unique interactions among 10,492 proteins. However it is not clear if this is unique proteins[13]	Protein interaction Database	??
Human Protein Reference Database			Institute of Bioinformatics (IOB), Bangalore, India				One source claims 15000 proteins. But it is unclear how many of these are unique		
Pfam			Sanger Institute			protein families database of alignments and HMMs		Protein sequence databases	
Human Proteinpedia			Institute of Bioinformatics (IOB), Bangalore and Johns Hopkins University,				The human Proteinpedia is based on HPRD (Human protein reference database)which is a repository hosting over 30,000 human proteins. However it is unclear how many of these are unique proteins		
Human Protein Atlas				The Swedish Government			It contains roughly 10 million IHC images of a bit less than 25,000 antibodies. But once again it is unclear how many of these are unique		
PRINTS			Manchester University			a compendium of protein fingerprints		Protein sequence databases	
PROSITE	Prosite					database of protein domains, families and functional sites		Protein sequence databases	
Protein Information Resource			Georgetown University Medical Center [GUMC]					Protein sequence databases	
SUPERFAMILY						library of HMMs representing superfamilies and database of (superfamily and family) annotations for all completely sequenced organisms		Protein sequence databases	
Swiss-Prot			Swiss Institute of Bioinformatics			protein knowledgebase		Protein sequence databases	
Protein Data Bank	RCSB PDB (Research Collaboratory for Structural Bioinformatics - Protein Data Bank)					Protein DataBank in Europe (PDBe), ProteinDatabank in Japan (PDBj), and RCSB	(PDB)	Protein structure databases	
Structural Classification of Proteins (SCOP)								Protein structure databases	
CATH database								Protein structure databases	
ModBase				Sali Lab, UCSF			database of comparative protein structure models	Protein model databases	
SIMAP						database of protein similarities computed using FASTA		Protein model databases	
Swiss-model						server and repository for protein structure models		Protein model databases	
AAindex						database of amino acid indices, amino acid mutation matrices, and pair-wise contact potentials		Protein model databases	
BioGRID				Samuel Lunenfeld Research Institute		general repository for interaction datasets		Protein-protein and other molecular interactions	
RNA-binding protein database								Protein-protein and other molecular interactions	
Database of Interacting Proteins			Univ. of California					Protein-protein and other molecular interactions	
IntAct			EMBL-EBI			open-source database for molecular interactions		Protein-protein and other molecular interactions	
String						an open source molecular interaction database to study interactions between proteins		Protein-protein and other molecular interactions	
Human Protein Atlas						Human Protein Atlas	aims at mapping all the human proteins in cells, tissues and organs	Protein expression databases	
ProteinModelPortal	Protein Model Portal of the PSI-Nature Structural Biology Knowledgebase	??		??				3D structure protein databases	
SWISS-MODEL Repository	Database of annotated 3D protein structure models	University of Basel		The Swiss government				3D structure protein databases	
DisProt	Database of Protein Disorder	ELIXIR infrastructure	Indiana University School of Medicine, Temple University, University of Padua	funding from the European Union's Horizon 2020	Swiss Prot/Uni Prot, CATH, Pfam, Europe PMC, BITEM, ECO, Geneontology	database of experimental evidences of disorder in proteins		3D structure protein databases, Protein sequence databases	
MobiDB	Database of intrinsically disordered and mobile proteins	John Moult, Christine Orengo, Predrag Radivojac	University of Padua	Italian Government		database of intrinsic protein disorder annotation		3D structure protein databases, Protein sequence databases	
ModBase	Database of Comparative Protein Structure Models	Ursula Pieper, Ben Webb, Narayanan Eswar, Andrej Sali Roberto Sanchez		UCSF, Sali Lab				3D structure protein databases	
PDBsum	Pictorial database of 3D structures in the Protein Data Bank	European Bioinformatics Institute 2013		Wellcome Trust				3D structure protein databases	
CCDS	The Consensus CDS protein set database	NCBI		??				Sequence databases	
UniProtKB	Universal Protein Resource (UniProt)	??		??				Sequence databases	
Swiss Prot/Uni Prot	Swiss Prot and Uni Prot		SIB Swiss Institute of Bioinformatics	European Bioinformatics Institute (EMBL-EBI)			Swiss-Prot has collected over 81 000 variants in roughly 13,000 human protein sequence records from peer-reviewed literature. It is unclear how many unique proteins types are present in the database.		

== Other protein database links ==
- The Pfam (proteins families) database link
- The Worldwide Protein Data Bank (wwPDB) link and the related foundation link

== Signal transduction pathway databases ==
- NCI-Nature Pathway Interaction Database
- Netpath: curated resource of signal transduction pathways in humans
- Reactome: navigable map of human biological pathways, ranging from metabolic processes to hormonal signalling (Ontario Institute for Cancer Research, European Bioinformatics Institute, NYU Langone Medical Center, Cold Spring Harbor Laboratory)
- WikiPathways

== Metabolic pathway and protein function databases ==
- BioCyc Database Collection: includes EcoCyc and MetaCyc
- BRENDA: the comprehensive enzyme information system, including FRENDA, AMENDA, DRENDA, and KENDA
- HMDB: contains detailed information about small molecule metabolites found in the human body
- KEGG PATHWAY Database (Univ. of Kyoto)
- MANET database (University of Illinois)
- Reactome: navigable map of human biological pathways, ranging from metabolic processes to hormonal signalling (Ontario Institute for Cancer Research, European Bioinformatics Institute, NYU Langone Medical Center, Cold Spring Harbor Laboratory)
- SABIO-RK: database for biochemical reactions and their kinetic properties
- WikiPathways

== Taxonomic databases ==
Numerous databases collect information about species and other taxonomic categories. The Catalogue of Life is a special case as it is a meta-database of about 150 specialized "global species databases" (GSDs) that have collected the names and other information on (almost) all described and thus "known" species.

- BacDive: bacterial metadatabase that provides strain-linked information about bacterial and archaeal biodiversity, including taxonomy information
- Catalogue of Life: a meta-database of all species on earth
- EzTaxon-e: database for the identification of prokaryotes based on 16S ribosomal RNA gene sequences
- NCBI Taxonomy: a taxonomic database operated by NCBI and concentrating on all taxa for which DNA sequences are available (those sequences are stored by GenBank, another database operated by NCBI).

== Image databases ==
Images play a critical role in biomedicine, ranging from images of anthropological specimens to zoology. However, there are relatively few databases dedicated to image collection, although some projects such as iNaturalist collect photos as a main part of their data. A special case of "images" are 3-dimensional images such as protein structures or 3D-reconstructions of anatomical structures. Image databases include, among others:

- Allen Brain Atlas
- Digital Brain Bank
- Electron Microscopy Public Image Archive (EMPIAR)
- FlyExpress
- Image Data Resource
- Morphobank
- Morphosource

=== Radiologic databases ===
- The Cancer Imaging Archive (TCIA)
- Neuroimaging Informatics Tools and Resources Clearinghouse

== Additional databases ==
=== Exosomal databases ===
- ExoCarta
- Extracellular RNA Atlas: a repository of small RNA-seq and qPCR-derived exRNA profiles from human and mouse biofluids

=== Mathematical model databases ===
- Biomodels Database: published mathematical models describing biological processes
- MorpheusML Model Repository: published, community-contributed, and educational multi-scale and multicellular models for systems biology

=== Databases on antimicrobial resistance rates and antibiotic consumption ===
- CIPARS
- EARS-Net
- ESAC-Net

=== Databases on antimicrobial resistance mechanisms ===
- AMRFinderPlus
- Antimicrobial Drug Database (AMDD)
- ARDB (no longer maintained)
- ARGminer
- BacMet
- Beta-Lactamase Database (BLAD)
- CBMAR
- The Comprehensive Antibiotic Resistance Database
- FARME
- INTEGRALL
- LacED
- MEGARes
- MUBII-TB-DB
- Mustard Database
- MvirDB
- PathoPhenoDB
- PATRIC database
- RAC: Repository of Antibiotic resistance Cassettes
- ResFinder
- TBDReaMDB
- u-CARE
- VFDB

=== Biological collections databases ===
- List of biodiversity databases
- IndExs – Index of Exsiccatae

== Wiki-style databases ==
- Gene Wiki
- WikiSpecies
- WikiProfessional

== Specialized databases ==
- Barcode of Life Data Systems: database of DNA barcodes
- Bacterial Pesticidal Protein Database
- The Cancer Genome Atlas (TCGA): provides data from hundreds of cancer samples obtained using high-throughput techniques such as gene expression profiling, copy number variation profiling, SNP genotyping, genome-wide DNA methylation profiling, microRNA profiling, and exon sequencing of at least 1,200 genes
- Cellosaurus: a knowledge resource on cell lines
- CTD (Comparative Toxicogenomics Database): describes chemical-gene-disease interactions
- DiProDB: a database to collect and analyse thermodynamic, structural and other dinucleotide properties
- Housekeeping and Reference Transcript Atlas (HRT Atlas) web-based tool for searching cell specific candidate reference genes/transcripts suitable for qPCR experiment normalization. HRT Atlas also describes a complete list of human and mouse housekeeping genes and transcripts
- Dryad: repository of data underlying scientific publications in the basic and applied biosciences
- Edinburgh Mouse Atlas
- EPD Eukaryotic Promoter Database
- FINDbase (the Frequency of INherited Disorders database)
- GigaDB: repository of large scale datasets underlying scientific publications in the biological and biomedical research
- HGNC (HUGO Gene Nomenclature Committee): a resource for approved human gene nomenclature
- International Human Epigenome Consortium: integrates epigenomic reference data from well-known national endeavors such as the Canadian CEEHRC, European Blueprint, European Genome-phenome Archive (EGA), US ENCODE and NIH Roadmap, German DEEP, Japanese CREST, Korean KNIH, Singapore's GIS and China's EpiHK
- MethBase: database of DNA methylation data visualized on the UCSC Genome Browser
- Minimotif Miner: database of short contiguous functional peptide motifs
- Oncogenomic databases: a compilation of databases that serve for cancer research
- PubMed: references and abstracts on life sciences and biomedical topics
- RIKEN integrated database of mammals
- TDR Targets: a chemogenomics database focused on drug discovery in tropical diseases
- TRANSFAC: a database about eukaryotic transcription factors, their genomic binding sites and DNA-binding profiles
- JASPAR: a database of manually curated, non-redundant transcription factor binding profiles.
- MetOSite: a database about methionine sulfoxidation sites and its functional roles in proteins
- Healthcare Cost and Utilization Project (HCUP) is the largest collection of hospital care data in the United States. It includes hundreds of millions of inpatient, outpatient, and emergency records.
- LEXAS curates descriptions of biological experiments from PMC articles.
- Bovine Metabolome Database is a free web database that lists known bovine metabolites
- Mouse Models of Human Cancer database is an curated database of mouse models of human cancer
