= SARG database =

Biological database

The SARG database also known as Structured Antibiotic Resistance Gene database is a collection of antimicrobial resistance genes. The hierarchical structure of the database is clear to be 1) Type: antibiotic type 2) Subtype: genotype 3) Sequence: reference sequence. The SARG database helps in quick survey of antimicrobial resistance genes from environmental samples. The database was initially integrated from ARDB and Comprehensive Antibiotic Resistance Database, followed by hand curation including removing non-ARG sequences, removing redundant sequences and SNP sequences. Other sources include NCBI nr database and published papers.

Online-analysis pipeline

== See also ==
- Antimicrobial Resistance databases
