= Phytozome =

Comparative genomics database for plant genomes

Content
- Description: A comparative genomics platform for sequenced plant genomes and green algae
- Data types captured: Plant and algal genomics
- Organisms: Viridiplantae (green plants and algae)

Contact
- Research center: Joint Genome Institute (DOE JGI)
- Laboratory: Lawrence Berkeley National Laboratory
- Primary citation: Goodstein DM, Shu S, Howson R, et al. Phytozome: a comparative platform for green plant genomics. Nucleic Acids Res. 2012;40(D1):D1178-D1186.
- Release date: 2009

Access
- Website: https://phytozome-next.jgi.doe.gov/
- Download URL: Yes
- Web service URL: REST API

Miscellaneous
- License: Open access
- Version: Phytozome Next (v13+)
- Curation policy: Automated and manual curation

Phytozome is an online bioinformatics database and comparative genomics platform that provides access to sequenced plant and green algal genomes. The resource is developed and maintained by the Joint Genome Institute (JGI), a U.S. Department of Energy (DOE) user facility operated by the Lawrence Berkeley National Laboratory.

Phytozome provides high-quality annotated genome sequences, gene models, orthology assignments, and comparative analysis tools for over 1,200 green plant and algal species. The platform enables researchers to study the evolutionary history of plant genes at the level of sequence, gene structure, gene family, and genome organization. It serves as a central resource for plant genomics research, supporting studies in crop improvement, ecology, bioenergy, and plant evolution.

== History ==
Phytozome was launched in 2009 by the DOE Joint Genome Institute in Walnut Creek, California, in response to the rapidly increasing number of sequenced plant genomes. The platform was designed to provide the broader plant science research community with access to genome sequences and functional annotations, along with comparative genomics tools to link model systems with plants of economic and ecological importance.

The platform has undergone multiple major version releases, expanding its taxonomic coverage and improving genome assemblies, annotation pipelines, and bioinformatics tools. The current iteration, known as "Phytozome Next," represents a unified platform that integrates updated comparative analysis capabilities.

Phytozome is funded by the DOE Office of Science, Biological and Environmental Research (BER) program, as part of the broader DOE Genomic Science Program infrastructure.

== Contents ==
Phytozome provides access to genome sequences and annotations for over 1,200 species across the Viridiplantae (green plants and algae), including all major land plant lineages and selected algal species. Genomes sequenced at the Joint Genome Institute are included alongside selected species sequenced by other institutions.

The database provides several types of data and analysis tools:

- Genome annotations: High-quality gene models and functional annotations for all included genomes, including Gene Ontology (GO) terms and pathway information
- Orthology and gene families: Orthologous gene clusters and phylogenetic trees enabling comparative analysis across species
- Synteny and collinearity: Whole-genome alignment data and synteny block visualization for studying genome evolution
- Sequence similarity search: Integrated BLAST and FASTA tools for sequence analysis
- Genome browser: JBrowse-based genome browser for visualization of gene models, annotations, and genomic tracks
- Data downloads: Bulk access to genome sequences, annotations (in GFF3 format), transcript and protein sequences, and comparative genomics datasets
- API access: RESTful API for programmatic data retrieval

Phytozome also integrates transcriptomic and expression datasets across multiple species, providing standardized functional data to support comparative studies.

== Related research ==
Phytozome is widely used in plant biology research. The founding publication describing the platform has been cited thousands of times in the scientific literature. Example applications include:

- Gene family identification: Researchers use Phytozome to identify and characterize gene families across plant species, enabling studies of gene duplication, diversification, and functional evolution.
- Comparative genomics and crop improvement: Phytozome's comparative tools support studies that link model organisms such as Arabidopsis thaliana with crop species, facilitating the transfer of knowledge from model systems to agriculturally important plants.
- Plant evolution studies: The platform's orthology and phylogenetic data support investigations into the evolutionary relationships among green plants and algae.

== Comparison with other resources ==
Phytozome is one of several plant genomics databases. Other resources include PLAZA, a separate comparative genomics platform for plants, and species-specific databases such as TAIR for Arabidopsis thaliana and SoyBase for soybean. Unlike species-specific databases, Phytozome focuses on providing a broad comparative framework across many plant species.

== See also ==
- Joint Genome Institute
- List of biological databases
- Model organism databases
- The Arabidopsis Information Resource
- PLAZA (database)
