= PathoPhenoDB =

PathoPhenoDB is a biological database. The database connects pathogens to their phenotypes using multiple databases such as NCBI, Human Disease Ontology Human Phenotype Ontology, Mammalian Phenotype Ontology, PubChem, SIDER and CARD. Pathogen-disease associations were gathered mainly through the CDC and the List of Infectious Diseases page on Wikipedia. The manner by which they assigned taxonomy was semi-automatic. When mapped against NCBI Taxonomy, if the pathogen was not an exact match, it was then mapped to the parent class. PathoPhenoDB employs NPMI in order to filter pairs based on their co-occurrence statistics.

== See also ==
- Antimicrobial Resistance databases
