= MvirDB =

Biological database

Content
- Description: A database of toxins, virulence factors and antibiotic resistance genes
- Data types captured: Toxins, Virulence Factors and Antibiotic resistance genes
- Organisms: Bacteria

Contact
- Primary citation: PMID 17090593

Access
- Website: mvirdb.llnl.gov

Miscellaneous
- Bookmarkable entities: yes

In molecular biology, MvirDB was a publicly available database that stored information on toxins, virulence factors and antibiotic resistance genes. Sources that this database used for DNA and protein information included: Tox-Prot, SCORPION, the PRINTS Virulence Factors, VFDB, TVFac, Islander, ARGO and VIDA. The database provided a BLAST tool that allowed the user to query their sequence against all DNA and protein sequences in MvirDB. Information on virulence factors could be obtained from the usage of the provided browser tool. Once the browser tool was used, the results were returned as a readable table that was organized by ascending E-Values, each of which were hyperlinked to their related page. MvirDB was implemented in an Oracle 10g relational database. MvirDB appears to have been inactive for some time, and is therefore not current. The last available snapshot was made on August 2, 2017.

== See also ==
- Antimicrobial Resistance databases
