= EPD =

EPD may refer to:

== Government and politics ==
- The Environmental Protection Department of the Government of Hong Kong
- Erie Police Department, Pennsylvania
- European Partnership for Democracy, an organization promoting democracy outside the European Union
- European Progressive Democrats, a defunct political group in the European Parliament
- Evansville Police Department (Indiana)

== Science and medicine ==
- Enzyme potentiated desensitization
- Etch pit density, a measure for the quality of semiconductor wafers
- Erythrose-4-phosphate dehydrogenase
- Eukaryotic Promoter Database
- European Pollen Database, a biological database
- Expected progeny difference

== Technology and industry ==
- Environmental product declaration
- Electronic paper display
- Electrophoretic deposition
- Electrophoretic display
- Equipment protective device
- Electronic personal dosimeter
- Enterprise Products
- EPD, the former name of Enthought Canopy, a Python distribution for scientific computing

== Other uses ==
- English Pronouncing Dictionary, by Daniel Jones, first published 1917
- Enterprise Products, an American pipeline company
- EPD Tour, a professional golf tour based in Germany
- Epsom Downs railway station, in England
- Extended Position Description, a chess notation
- Nintendo Entertainment Planning & Development, an internal division of the video game company Nintendo
