= Integrative bioinformatics =

Integrative bioinformatics is a discipline of bioinformatics that focuses on problems of data integration for the life sciences.

With the rise of high-throughput (HTP) technologies in the life sciences, particularly in molecular biology, the amount of collected data has grown in an exponential fashion. Furthermore, the data are scattered over a plethora of both public and private repositories, and are stored using a large number of different formats. This situation makes searching these data and performing the analysis necessary for the extraction of new knowledge from the complete set of available data very difficult. Integrative bioinformatics attempts to tackle this problem by providing unified access to life science data.

== Approaches ==
=== Semantic web approaches ===
In the Semantic Web approach, data from multiple websites or databases is searched via metadata. Metadata is machine-readable code, which defines the contents of the page for the program so that the comparisons between the data and the search terms are more accurate. This serves to decrease the number of results that are irrelevant or unhelpful. Some meta-data exists as definitions called ontologies, which can be tagged by either users or programs; these serve to facilitate searches by using key terms or phrases to find and return the data. Advantages of this approach include the general increased quality of the data returned in searches and with proper tagging, ontologies finding entries that may not explicitly state the search term but are still relevant. One disadvantage of this approach is that the results that are returned come in the format of the database of their origin and as such, direct comparisons may be difficult. Another problem is that the terms used in tagging and searching can sometimes be ambiguous and may cause confusion among the results. In addition, the semantic web approach is still considered an emerging technology and is not in wide-scale use at this time.

One of the current applications of ontology-based search in the biomedical sciences is GoPubMed, which searches the PubMed database of scientific literature. Another use of ontologies is within databases such as SwissProt, Ensembl and TrEMBL, which use this technology to search through the stores of human proteome-related data for tags related to the search term.

Some of the research in this field has focused on creating new and specific ontologies. Other researchers have worked on verifying the results of existing ontologies. In a specific example, the goal of Verschelde, et al. was the integration of several different ontology libraries into a larger one that contained more definitions of different subspecialties (medical, molecular biological, etc.) and was able to distinguish between ambiguous tags; the result was a data-warehouse like effect, with easy access to multiple databases through the use of ontologies. In a separate project, Bertens, et al. constructed a lattice work of three ontologies (for anatomy and development of model organisms) on a novel framework ontology of generic organs. For example, results from a search of ‘heart’ in this ontology would return the heart plans for each of the vertebrate species whose ontologies were included. The stated goal of the project is to facilitate comparative and evolutionary studies.

=== Data warehousing approaches ===
In the data warehousing strategy, the data from different sources are extracted and integrated in a single database. For example, various 'omics' datasets may be integrated to provide biological insights into biological systems. Examples include data from genomics, transcriptomics, proteomics, interactomics, metabolomics. Ideally, changes in these sources are regularly synchronized to the integrated database. The data is presented to the users in a common format. Many programs aimed to aid in the creation of such warehouses are designed to be extremely versatile to allow for them to be implemented in diverse research projects. One advantage of this approach is that data is available for analysis at a single site, using a uniform schema. Some disadvantages are that the datasets are often huge and difficult to keep up to date. Another problem with this method is that it is costly to compile such a warehouse.

Standardized formats for different types of data (ex: protein data) are now emerging due to the influence of groups like the Proteomics Standards Initiative (PSI). Some data warehousing projects even require the submission of data in one of these new formats.

=== Other approaches ===
Data mining uses statistical methods to search for patterns in existing data. This method generally returns many patterns, of which some are spurious and some are significant, but all of the patterns the program finds must be evaluated individually. Currently, some research is focused on incorporating existing data mining techniques with novel pattern analysis methods that reduce the need to spend time going over each pattern found by the initial program, but instead, return a few results with a high likelihood of relevance. One drawback of this approach is that it does not integrate multiple databases, which means that comparisons across databases are not possible. The major advantage to this approach is that it allows for the generation of new hypotheses to test.

== See also ==
- Biological database
- Biological data visualization
- InterMine - an open-source biological data warehouse system
