= List of Drosophila databases =

Research on the model organism Drosophila melanogaster has been facilitated by the development of a number of online databases for the storage and curation of certain biological data.

== DroID ==
The Drosophila Interactions Database (DroID) is an online database of Drosophila gene and protein interactions. It was developed by Russell L. Finley's laboratory at Wayne State University School of Medicine in 2008 and has been funded by the National Human Genome Research Institute, National Institutes of Health's National Center for Research Resources, Michigan Proteome Consortium, and Wayne State University.

== FlyBase ==
FlyBase is the major online database for scientists who work on Drosophila. It contains genome data for various Drosophila species, gene annotations, gene function predictions, and a variety of experimental data that can be overlaid over the genome. FlyBase was developed in 1992 by Michael Ashburner at the University of Cambridge, but is now run by a consortium of groups from Harvard University, University of Cambridge, Indiana University, and the University of New Mexico.

== FlyExpress ==
FlyExpress is a database of images of gene expression patterns for D. melanogaster in embryogenesis, containing over 100,000 images of over 4,000 genes. It was developed by the Center of Evolutionary Medicine and Informatics of the Biodesign Institute of Arizona State University.

== FlyFactorSurvey ==
FlyFactorSurvey is a database of Drosophila transcription factors determined using the bacterial one-hybrid system. It was developed by the laboratories of Michael H. Brodsky and Scot Wolfe at the University of Massachusetts Medical School in 2011, and was funded by the National Human Genome Research Institute

== FlyMine ==
FlyMine is a database of transcription, protein expression, and other protein data for Drosophila and Anopheles species. It was originally developed by Gos Micklem's group at Cambridge University in 2007. FlyMine is funded primarily by Wellcome Trust, with elements of the database supported by the National Human Genome Research Institute and the Biotechnology and Biological Sciences Research Council.

== OnTheFly ==
OnTheFly is a database of D. melanogaster transcription factors and the DNA sequences they bind. It was developed by the laboratory of Barry Honig at Columbia University Medical School in 2013.

== REDfly ==
REDfly (Regulatory Element Database) is a database of Drosophila cis-regulatory elements. It was developed by the laboratory of Marc S. Halfon at the University of Buffalo in 2006, and has been funded by the National Science Foundation and the National Institute of General Medical Sciences.
