= Mustard Database =

Biological database

Mustard
Content
- Description: Contains AR determinants and curated AR genes identified from metagenomics
- Data types captured: Antimicrobial resistance genes and AR Determinants
- Organisms: Bacteria

Contact
- Primary citation: PMID 30478291

Access
- Website: mgps.eu/Mustard/
- Download URL: Download

Miscellaneous
- Bookmarkable entities: yes

Mustard is a database that tracks Antimicrobial Resistance Determinants (ARDs). The method by which it tracks ARDs is using their own method adapted from Protein Homology Modelling called Pairwise Comparative Modelling (PCM), which increase specificity protein prediction, especially for distantly related protein homologues. Using PCM, 6095 ARDs from 20 families in the human gut microbiota. Antibiotic resistance databases used were ResFinder, ARG-ANNOT, the now defunct Lahey Clinic, Marilyn Roberts website for tetracycline and macrolide resistance genes and metagenomics.

== See also ==
- Antimicrobial Resistance databases
