= MUBII-TB-DB =

Biological database

Content
- Description: A database that documents and tracks tuberculosis antibiotic resistance genes.
- Data types captured: Tuberculosis antibiotic resistance genes
- Organisms: Bacteria

Contact
- Primary citation: PMID 24731071

Access
- Website: umr5558-bibiserv.univ-lyon1.fr/mubii/mubii-select.cgi

Miscellaneous
- Bookmarkable entities: yes

MUBII-TB-DB is a database that focuses on tuberculosis antibiotic resistance genes. It is a highly structured, text-based database focusing on Mycobacterium tuberculosis at seven different mutation loci: rpoB, pncA, katG; mabA(fabG1)-inhA, gyrA, gyrB, and rrs. MUBII analyzes the query using two parallel strategies: 1). A BLAST search against previously mutated sequences. 2). Alignment of query sequences with wild-type sequences. MUBII outputs graphs of alignments and description of the mutation and therapeutic significance. Therapeutically relevant mutations are tagged as "High-Confident" based on the criteria set by Sandgren et al. MUBII-TB-DB provides a platform that is easy to use for even users that are not trained in bioinformatics.

== See also ==
- Antimicrobial Resistance databases
