= Repository of Antibiotic resistance Cassettes =

Biological database

RAC: Repository of Antibiotic resistance Cassettes
Content
- Description: Database focused on the discovery and annotation of novel gene cassettes and other transposable elements.
- Data types captured: Gene Cassettes and Transposable elements
- Organisms: Bacteria

Contact
- Primary citation: PMID 22140215

Access
- Website: www2.chi.unsw.edu.au/rac.

Miscellaneous
- Bookmarkable entities: yes

RAC otherwise known as Repository of Antibiotic resistance Cassettes is a database that uses the automatic Attacca annotation system in order to comprehensively annotate gene-cassettes and transposable elements in a stream-lined manner and to discover novel gene cassettes. Antibiotic resistance is often due to horizontal gene transfer, which allows resistance to arise through cell-to-cell interaction. This poses a major challenge in the field of antibiotic resistance. Hence, the creation of RAC which would provide researchers a comprehensive and unique tool for the endeavor of documenting resistance due to gene-cassettes and transposable elements. Attacca helps discover novel gene cassettes when any three of the following occurs as mentioned in Tsafnat et al, 2011:

- the Attacca discovery heuristics (19) identify a gap in a cassette array that could correspond to a novel cassette;
- a cassette encoding a potentially novel β-lactamase variant is detected; or
- the type of sequence submitted (e.g. isolated cassette) suggests that a gene cassette should be present but a gene cassette is not found by Attacca.

If any of these cases occur, the gene-cassette would be sent to review at the Centre for Infectious Diseases and Microbiology, University of Sydney for further examination.

== See also ==
- Antimicrobial Resistance databases
