= INTEGRALL =

Biological database

Integrall
Content
- Description: Database that collects and documents integrons and transposable elements conferring resistance.
- Data types captured: Integrons and other transposable elements
- Organisms: Bacteria

Contact
- Primary citation: PMID 19228805

Access
- Website: integrall.bio.ua.pt

Miscellaneous
- Bookmarkable entities: yes

Integrall is a database that seeks to document and annotate integrons and all other transposable elements that confer resistance to antibiotics in bacteria.

As of release 1.2, Integrall contains ~4800 integron sequences. Transposable elements and Integrons in bacteria are a major threat in the field of antimicrobial drug research because they allow bacteria to develop resistances through interbacterial interactions. They allow bacteria to develop resistances that they typically cannot. Thus, Integrall seeks to be a comprehensive and unified database that facilitates the understanding and usage of integron information. Integrall is built on PHP5 using MySQL 5.0.

== See also ==
- Antimicrobial resistance databases
