= LacED =

Biological database

The Lactase Engineering Database
Content
- Description: Database of Beta-lactamases that allows reconciliation of TEM Beta-lactamase information against NCBI
- Data types captured: Beta-lactamase
- Organisms: Bacteria

Contact
- Primary citation: PMID 19698099

Access
- Website: www.laced.uni-stuttgart.de

Miscellaneous
- Bookmarkable entities: yes

LacED, also known as The Lactamase Engineering Database, is a database that identifies and corrects inconsistencies in already existing databases, namely Beta-lactamases. It integrates such information as mutations, sequence alignments, and structures in order to accomplish the task. As of the publication of the primary literature, LacED provides 2399 sequences entries and 37 structure entries. Example of this database in action is shown when 89 proteins from the microbial organisms and 35 proteins from cloning or expression vectors had new mutation profiles. Additionally, 55 proteins had inconsistent annotations in their TEM assignments or mutation profiles.

== See also ==
- Antimicrobial resistance databases
