= BacMet =

Antimicrobial resistance database

Content
- Data types captured: Antimicrobial resistance genes and phenotypes
- Organisms: Bacteria

Contact
- Research center: University of Gothenburg
- Primary citation: PMID 24304895

Access
- Website: bacmet.biomedicine.gu.se
- Download URL: Download

Miscellaneous
- Bookmarkable entities: yes

BacMet is an antimicrobial resistance database. It tracks bacterial genes that give resistance to antibacterial biocides and metals.

BacMet consists of two internal databases. One is a manually curated database of genes with experimentally verified resistance function, while the other database looks at predicted resistant genes. The former's data is compiled from NCBI while the annotations are from UniProt and Gene Ontology. BacMet provides information on the resistant genes, their sequences, and their molecular functions.

The database has over 700 confirmed genes and over 150,000 predicted genes that are organized by molecular function and resistant phenotypes. As of May 2021, BacMet was last updated in March 2018 and is based at the University of Gothenburg in Sweden.

== See also ==
- List of antimicrobial resistance databases
