= FARME =

Biological database

Functional Antibiotic Resistance Metagenomic Element
Content
- Description: Compilation of publicly available predicted proteins and DNA elements that confer Antibiotic Resistance, regulatory elements and mobile genetic elements.
- Data types captured: Antimicrobial resistance genes and DNA Elements
- Organisms: Bacteria

Contact
- Primary citation: PMID 28077567

Access
- Website: staff.washington.edu/jwallace/farme/
- Download URL: Download

Miscellaneous
- Bookmarkable entities: yes

FARME also known as Functional Antibiotic Resistance Metagenomic Element is a database that compiles publicly available DNA elements and predicted proteins that confer antibiotic resistance, regulatory elements and mobile genetic elements. It is the first database to focus on functional metagenomics. This allows the database to understand 99% of bacteria which cannot be cultured, the relationship between environmental antibiotic resistance sequences and antibiotic genes derived from cultured isolates. This information was derived from 20 metagenomics projects from GenBank. Also from GenBank are the protein sequence predictions and annotations.

== See also ==
- Antimicrobial Resistance databases
