= Nucleosome positioning region database =

NPRD

Content
- Description: Nucleosome Positioning Region Database.

Contact
- Primary citation: Levitsky & al. (2005)

Access
- Website: srs6.bionet.nsc.ru/srs6/

Miscellaneous
- Version: 22-Feb-2007

Nucleosome Positioning Region Database (NPRD) is a database of nucleosome formation sites (NFSs).

== See also ==
- International Society for Computational Biology
- List of biological databases
- Bioinformatics
- Biostatistics
- Biological simulation
- Mathematical biology
- Strbase
- Structural genomics
- Systems biology
