= Model organism database =

Type of biological database

Model organism databases (MODs) are biological databases, or knowledgebases, dedicated to the provision of in-depth biological data for intensively studied model organisms. MODs allow researchers to easily find background information on large sets of genes, efficiently plan experiments, integrate their data with existing knowledge, and formulate new hypotheses. They allow users to analyse results and interpret datasets, and the data they generate are increasingly used to describe less well studied species. Where possible, MODs share common approaches to collect and represent biological information. For example, all MODs use the Gene Ontology (GO) to describe functions, processes and cellular locations of specific gene products. Projects also exist to enable software sharing for curation, visualization and querying between different MODs. Organismal diversity and varying user requirements however mean that MODs are often required to customize capture, display, and provision of data.

== Types of data and services ==
Model organism databases generate, source and collate species-specific information integratively by combining expert knowledge with literature curation and bioinformatics.

Services provided to biological research communities include:

- Genome sequence annotations
  - Location of genes and regulatory regions in the genome
- Functional curation of gene products
  - Discern functions fulfilled by the gene product by looking at a variety of data including Gene Ontology (GO) annotations, phenotypes, gene expression, pathway information
- Protein/RNA sequence annotations
- Anatomical information
- Stock centres
- Orthology

== List of databases ==
Common name	Scientific name	Wikipedia page	Database link-out
Baker's yeast	Saccharomyces cerevisiae	Saccharomyces Genome Database	SGD
Fission yeast	Schizosaccharomyces pombe	PomBase	PomBase
Clawed frog	Xenopus	Xenbase	Xenbase
Sea urchins, starfish, etc.	Echinodermata	Echinobase	Echinobase
Fruitfly	Drosophila melanogaster	FlyBase	FlyBase
Bees, wasps, ants	Hymenoptera	Hymenoptera Genome Database	HGD
Mouse	Mus musculus	Mouse Genome Informatics	MGI
Nematode	Caenorhabditis elegans	WormBase	WormBase
Rat	Rattus norvegicus	Rat Genome Database	RGD
Social amoeba	Dictyostelium discoideum	DictyBase	dictyBase
Ciliate	Tetrahymena thermophila	Tetrahymena Genome Database	TGD
Thale cress	Arabidopsis thaliana	The Arabidopsis Information Resource	TAIR
Maize	Zea mays ssp. mays	-	MaizeGDB
Soybean	Glycine soja	SoyBase	SoyBase
Zebrafish	Danio rerio	Zebrafish Information Network	ZFIN
-	Candida albicans	-	CGD
-	Escherichia coli	EcoCyc	EcoCyc
Hay bacillus	Bacillus subtilis	-	SubtiWiki
