= PolyQ (database) =

Content
- Description: sequence and domain context of polyglutamine repeats in proteins.

Contact
- Research center: Monash University
- Laboratory: Department of Biochemistry and Molecular Biology
- Authors: Amy L Robertson
- Primary citation: Robertson & al. (2011)
- Release date: 2010

Access
- Website: http://pxgrid.med.monash.edu.au/polyq

PolyQ is a biological database of polyglutamine repeats in disease and non-disease associated proteins.

== See also ==
- Trinucleotide repeat disorder
