= MEGARes =

Curated antibiotic resistance gene database

Content
- Description: MEGARes is an antimicrobial resistance database made for high throughput sequencing based at collaborating centers
- Data types captured: Antimicrobial resistance genes and phenotypes
- Organisms: Bacteria

Contact
- Research center: Texas A&M University, University of Minnesota, University of Florida, Colorado State Uninversity
- Primary citation: PMID 27899569

Access
- Website: http://meglab.org
- Download URL: Download

Miscellaneous
- Bookmarkable entities: yes

MEGARes is a hand-curated antibiotic resistance database which incorporates previously published resistance sequences for antimicrobial drugs, while also expanding to include published sequences for metal and biocide resistance determinants. In MEGARes 3.0, the nodes of the acyclic hierarchical ontology include four antimicrobial compound types, 59 classes, 223 mechanisms of resistance, and 1,448 gene groups that classify the 8,733 gene accessions. This works in conjunction with the AMR++ bioinformatics pipelin (version 3.0) to classify resistome sequences directly from FASTA.

The database focuses on the analysis of large-scale, ecological sequence datasets with an annotation structure that allows for the development of high throughput acyclical classifiers and hierarchical statistical analysis of big data. MEGARes annotation consists of three hierarchical levels when looking at AMR genes: drug class, mechanism, and group. The comprehensive MEGARes content was compiled from all published sequences included various other databases: Resfinder, ARG-ANNOT, Comprehensive Antibiotic Resistance Database (CARD), and the National Center for Biotechnology Information (NCBI) Lahey Clinic beta-lactamase archive.

MEGARes allows users to analyze antimicrobial resistance on a population-level, similar to a microbiome analysis, from a FASTA sequence. Furthermore, users can access AMR++, a bioiinformatics pipeline for resistome analysis of metagenomic datasets that can be integrated with the MEGARes database.

== See also ==
- Antimicrobial Resistance databases
