= PolymiRTS =

Content
- Description: polymorphisms in microRNA target sites with complex traits.

Contact
- Primary citation: Bao & al. (2007)
- Release date: 2006

Access
- Website: http://compbio.uthsc.edu/miRSNP/
- Download URL: download

Polymorphism in microRNA Target Site (PolymiRTS) is a database of naturally occurring DNA variations in putative microRNA target sites.

== See also ==
- MicroRNA
- List of miRNA target prediction tools
