= ARDB =

Biological database

Antibiotic Resistance Genes Database
Content
- Description: A database that tracks antibiotic resistance genes.
- Data types captured: Antibiotic resistance genes
- Organisms: Bacteria

Contact
- Primary citation: PMID 18832362

Access
- Website: ardb.cbcb.umd.edu

Miscellaneous
- Bookmarkable entities: yes

ARDB also known as Antibiotic Resistance Genes Database is a database that tracks antibiotic resistance genes with information such as mechanism of action, resistance profile, ontology, Clusters of Orthologous Genes (COG) and Conserved Domain Database (CDD) annotations. It also contains links to external databases. The database is also for the identification of new resistance genes. During the creation of ARDB in 2009, there was no comprehensive annotation system available. Thus, ontology terms for resistance profiles and mechanisms of actions were created for ARDB. Other things classified by ontology include drug target modification, drug enzymatic destruction and drug transport. Drug transporters are further subclassified by MFS Efflux pumps, SMR Efflux pumps, ABC Efflux pumps, RND Efflux pumps following conventions outlined in this paper. Currently, ARDB contains resistance information for 13,293 genes, 377 types, 257 antibiotics, 632 genomes, 933 species and 124 genera.

ARDB is no longer maintained. All ARDB data are in CARD, which the developers now recommend instead.

== See also ==
- List of biological databases
