= InterMine =

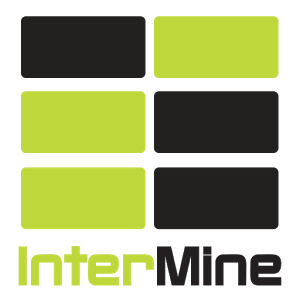

Content
- Description: Open source data warehouse system for the integration and analysis of biological data.
- Organisms: varied

Access
- Website: http://www.intermine.org/
- Download URL: https://github.com/intermine/intermine
- Web service URL: http://iodocs.apps.intermine.org/

Miscellaneous
- License: LGPL 2.1
- Data release frequency: Quarterly
- Version: 1.6.6
- Bookmarkable entities: Yes

InterMine is an open source data warehouse system, licensed under the LGPL 2.1. InterMine is used to create databases of biological data accessed by sophisticated web query tools. InterMine can be used to create databases from a single data set or can integrate multiple sources of data. Support is provided for several common biological formats and there is a framework for adding other data. InterMine includes a user-friendly web interface that works 'out of the box' and can be easily customised.

InterMine makes it easy to integrate multiple data sources into a single data warehouse. It has a core data model based on the sequence ontology and supports several biological data formats, allowing sysadmins to configure which organisms or data files are required. It is easy to extend the data model and integrate other data, with a web service API, clients in seven different languages, and an XML format to help import custom data.

As an active open source project, InterMine maintains a developer mailing list and thorough developer and user documentation.

== Supported data formats ==
- Chado
- GFF3
- FASTA
- GO & gene association files
- UniProt XML
- PSI XML (protein interactions, Protein Structure Initiative)
- InParanoid orthologs
- Ensembl

== Clients ==
Web clients allow users to access the data programmatically with minimal effort, and are available for perl, python, ruby, javascript, Java, and R. Data can also be queried via a native Android app.

== Web application ==
The InterMine web application allows creation of custom bioinformatics queries, includes template queries (web forms to run 'canned' queries). Users can upload and operate on lists of data. It is possible to configure/create widgets to analyse lists with graphs and enrichment statistics.

An admin user can publish new template queries, change report pages and create public lists at any time without any programming. Many aspects of the web app can be configured and branded.

== Current projects (not exhaustive list) ==
An up-to-date list of projects can be viewed at the InterMine Registry

- Generic Model Organism Database
- modENCODE
- FlyMine
- HumanMine
- RatMine
- YeastMine
- TargetMine
- MitoMiner
- MouseMine
- ZebrafishMine
- WormMine
- INDIGO
- ThaleMine
- TargetMine
- PhytoMine
- MedicMine
- BovineMine
- HymenopteraMine
- SoyMine
- BeanMine
- ChickpeaMine
- LegumeMine
- PeanutMine
- Shaare
- Wheat3Bmine
- PlanMine
- GrapeMine
- RepetDB
- XenMine
- CHOMine
