= TDR Targets =

Content
- Description: Chemogenomics resource for neglected diseases
- Data types captured: Genomics, Medicinal Chemistry
- Organisms: Human Pathogens that cause Neglected Tropical Diseases (NTDs): Plasmodium, Trypanosoma, Leishmania, Mycobacterium, Chlamydia, Treponema, Wolbachia endosymbionts, Giardia, Entamoeba, Trichomonas, Schistosoma, Echinococcus, Onchocerca, Brugia, Loa loa,

Contact
- Research center: UNSAM, CONICET
- Laboratory: (Argentina) Trypanosomatics Laboratory, UNSAM
- Authors: Fernán Agüero, Lionel Urán Landaburu, Santiago Carmona, María Paula Magariños, Ariel J Berenstein, Santiago Videla, Ariel Chernomoretz, Parag Maru, Dhanasekaran Shanmugam (current). Gregory Crowther, Matt Berriman, Stuart Ralph, David Roos, Wes Van Voorhis (past).
- Primary citation: Urán Landaburu L et al. (2019)
- Release date: 2007

Access
- Website: https://tdrtargets.org

Tools
- Web: Perl MVC (Catalyst (software), DBIx::Class)

Miscellaneous
- Versioning: TDR Targets 6
- Data release frequency: 18 months
- Version: 6
- Curation policy: yes

The TDR Targets database is a bioinformatics project that seeks to exploit the availability of diverse genomic and chemical datasets to facilitate the identification and prioritization of drugs and drug targets in neglected disease pathogens. TDR in the name of the database stands from the popular abbreviation for a special programme within the World Health Organization, whose focus is Tropical Disease Research. The project was jumpstarted by funds from this programme (see Special Programme for Research and Training in Tropical Diseases), and the initial focus of the resource was on organisms/diseases of high priority for this Programme.

The database functions both as a website, where researchers can look for information on targets or compounds of interest, or as a tool for prioritization of targets in whole genomes. When prioritizing genes, individual database queries are used to specify one or more desirable or undesirable criteria. The output of each query will be a set of genes (e.g. all genes that produce a lethal phenotype upon a genetic knockout); and different combinations of gene sets can be obtained using standard set operators (Union, Intersection, Subtraction), including the possibility of weighting genes present in more than one set (this is particularly useful when calculating Unions). A number of prioritizations obtained with this tool have been published, demonstrating a number of use cases.

The database currently hosts information for 21 bacterial and eukaryotic pathogens, and for > 2 million bioactive compounds. Information integrated into the TDR Targets database comes from disparate data sources, and therefore cannot be considered a primary data repository.

The database has seen six major releases since its launch in 2007, which coincided with expansion of phylogenetic coverage (e.g. inclusion of helminth genomes in release 2), incorporation of new functionalities (e.g. chemical similarity and substructure searches in release 4), major data updates to keep the database in sync with upstream data providers (in release 5), and the incorporation of a multilayer network model to guide Drug repositioning through nice user-friendly visualizations (in release 6).

== See also ==
ChEMBL
