= AMRFinderPlus =

Bioinformatic tool

NCBI Antimicrobial Resistance Gene Finder (AMRFinderPlus)
- Developer: National Center for Biotechnology Information
- Written in: C++
- Operating system: UNIX, Linux, Mac, MS-Windows
- Type: Bioinformatics tool
- License: Public domain
- Website: www.ncbi.nlm.nih.gov/pathogens/antimicrobial-resistance/AMRFinder/

The AMRFinderPlus tool from the National Center for Biotechnology Information (NCBI) is a bioinformatic tool that allows users to identify antimicrobial resistance determinants, stress response, and virulence genes in bacterial genomes. This tool's development began in 2018 (as AMRFinder) and is still underway. The National Institutes of Health funds the development of the software and the databases it uses.

== Usage ==
AMRFinderPlus is used by NCBI's Pathogen Detection Project, which clusters and finds similar pathogen genomic sequences from food, environmental sources, and patients. AMRFinderPlus is run for each bacterial isolate in the Pathogen Detection Project, and the findings are provided for public use. Since its scientific publication in 2021, it has also gathered citations from other users.

== Database design and curation ==
AMRFinderPlus can detect acquired antibiotic resistance, stress response, and virulence genes, and genetic mutations that are known to confer antibiotic resistance. When AMRFinderPlus was initially developed and distributed, there were already multiple databases containing antibiotic resistance determinants. The team collaborated with database developers, expert panels, and others to consolidate these sources and create a high-quality resource that addressed limitations in these different data sources that the community had highlighted at the time. The NCBI team also collaborates with expert groups to develop the database and its annotation on a regular basis. Continuous evaluation of review papers and new reports of resistance proteins augment these sources.

While some AMR gene identification tools rely on BLAST-based methodologies, others employ hidden Markov model (HMM) approaches. BLAST-based methods can identify particular alleles and genes that are closely related, but they often apply arbitrary cutoffs that can misidentify AMR genes or assign resistance to non-AMR genes. In AMRFinderPlus, custom BLAST cutoffs are created for each gene to optimize sensitivity and specificity of detection. Unlike BLAST-based approaches, which apply the same penalty for sequence mismatches across any sequence, HMMs allow for the weighing of sequence mismatches based on how prevalent they are in nature, resulting in higher accuracy in detecting true homologs than BLAST-based approaches, but these models require curation and validation to ensure accuracy.

The tool's Bacterial Antimicrobial Resistance Reference Gene Database consists of up-to-date gene nomenclature, a set of hidden Markov models (HMMs), and a curated protein family hierarchy. The database contains over 627 AMR HMMs, 6,428 genes, and 682 mutations, placing this data in a hierarchical framework of gene families, symbols, and names in collaboration with multiple groups. The genes in the database consist of 5588 AMR genes, 210 stress response genes, and 630 virulence genes. The AMR genes cover resistance to 31 different classes of antibiotic and 58 specific drugs.

Sequence records include, where possible, an additional 100 bp on either side of the coding region to assist in the design of primers. Cutoffs were set individually for each HMM through a manual process that involved confirmation of the supporting literature, benchmarking against other AMR proteins from related families, and the background of millions of additional proteins included in NCBI's non redundant protein sequence database.

== Usage rights ==
Under the rules of the United States Copyright Act, NCBI AMRFinderPlus is classed as "United States Government Work." It is considered to be work performed as part of the developers' "official obligations for the US government", and is therefore not protected by copyright. The software is therefore freely accessible to the public for use and there are no limitations on its current or future use.

== See also ==
- Antimicrobial resistance
- Genomics
- Bioinformatics
