= ResFinder =

Biological database

Content
- Description: Database of Antimicrobial Resistance genes.
- Data types captured: Antimicrobial Resistance
- Organisms: Bacteria

Contact
- Primary citation: PMID 22782487

Access
- Website: www.genomicepidemiology.org.

Miscellaneous
- Bookmarkable entities: yes

ResFinder is a database that captures antimicrobial resistance genes from whole-genome data sets. The database uses BLAST in order to accomplish this. The database allows inputs of full sequences, partial sequences, or short sequence reads from other sequencing platforms. Additionally, users can set their own threshold for detection. By default it is at 100% ID. ResFinder pulls from other database such as the Marilyn Roberts database, the Lahey database (now defunct) and ARDB. Other sources include published literature including reviews.

== See also ==
- Antimicrobial Resistance databases
