= Cervical Cancer Gene Database =

CCDB

Content
- Description: genes involved in cervix cancer.
- Release date: 2010

Access
- Website: http://crdd.osdd.net/raghava/ccdb

Tools
- Web: BLAST

The Cervical Cancer gene DataBase (CCDB) is a database of genes involved in the cervical carcinogenesis. The Cervical Cancer Database is the first database that has been manually curated. The database serves as an entity for clinicians and researchers to examine basic information as well as advanced information about the genes that differentiates into cervical cancer. There are 537 genes that have been cataloged into the CCBD. The genes that have been cataloged based on polymorphism, methylation, amplification of genes, and the change in how the gene is expressed. Science investigators have examined data that compared normal cervical cells with malignant cervical cells which has been used to study the different gene expressions that result in cervical cancer. Of the 500,000 women that have succumbed to cervical, most are from developing countries as well as of the low socioeconomic level in developed countries. The CCBD is designed to present information that will novel therapeutic treatments for leading cause of cancer within the population of women.

== Components ==
- miRNA of the gene
- the PubMed report of the gene
- host and target gene
- location as well as the fold change of protein
- the expression or alteration of the gene.

== Uses ==
The cervical cancer database consists of data that users (researchers and clinicians) of the system can find out if a gene leads to the expression of cervical cancer. The clinicians and researchers will also be able to collect data as it relates to genes that may differentiate into cervical cancer. There are several forms of cervical cancer that hypermethylate. The CCDB provides pertinent data as to which tumor-suppressor gene silences the gene expression of cervical cancer.

== Access ==
Clinicians or researchers may search for a gene using the gene chromosome number, gene I.D., or gene name. Researchers may add information about genes that code for cervical cancer, but before the data is added to the database, it must be validated by the scientific community.

== See also ==
- Cervical cancer
