= VFDB =

Biological database

Virulence Factor Database
Content
- Description: A database that tracks bacterial virulence factors
- Data types captured: Pathogenic bacteria
- Organisms: Bacteria

Contact
- Primary citation: PMID 15608208

Access
- Website: www.mgc.ac.cn/VFs/main.htm

Miscellaneous
- Bookmarkable entities: yes

VFDB also known as Virulence Factor Database is a database that provides scientist quick access to virulence factors in bacterial pathogens. It can be navigated and browsed using genus or words. A BLAST tool is provided for search against known virulence factors. VFDB contains a collection of 16 important bacterial pathogens. Perl scripts were used to extract positions and sequences of VF from GenBank. Clusters of Orthologous Groups (COG) was used to update incomplete annotations. More information was obtained by NCBI. VFDB was built on Windows operation systems on DELL PowerEdge 1600SC servers.

== See also ==
- Antimicrobial resistance databases
