= AAindex =

Content
- Description: amino acids matrices.

Contact
- Primary citation: PMID 17998252

Access
- Website: https://www.genome.jp/aaindex/
- Download URL: ftp://ftp.genome.jp/pub/db/community/aaindex/

AAindex is a database of amino acid indices, amino acid mutation matrices, and pair-wise contact potentials. The data represent various physicochemical and biochemical properties of amino acids and pairs of amino acids.

== See also ==
- Proteinogenic amino acid
