= Morphobank =

Web application for collaborative evolutionary research

MorphoBank
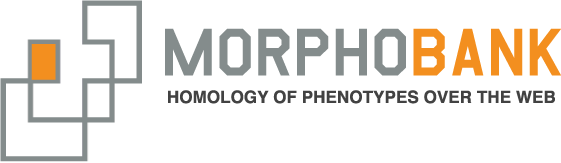
- Developer: The MorphoBank Project
- Release: 2001
- Operating system: Web-based application
- Type: Evolutionary research, systematics
- Website: morphobank.org

MorphoBank is a web application for collaborative evolutionary research, specifically phylogenetic systematics or cladistics, on the phenotype. Historically, scientists conducting research on phylogenetic systematics have worked individually or in small groups employing traditional single-user software applications such as MacClade, Mesquite and Nexus Data Editor. As the hypotheses under study have grown more complex, large research teams have assembled to tackle the problem of discovering the Tree of Life for the estimated 4-100 million living species (Wilson 2003, pp. 77–80) and the many thousands more extinct species known from fossils. Because the phenotype is fundamentally visual, and as phenotype-based phylogenetic studies have continued to increase in size, it becomes important that observations be backed up by labeled images. Traditional desktop software applications currently in wide use do not provide robust support for team-based research or for image manipulation and storage. MorphoBank is a particularly important tool for the growing scientific field of phenomics.

The development of MorphoBank, which began in 2001, has been funded by the National Science Foundation's Directorates for Geosciences, Biological Sciences and Computer and Information Science and Engineering. The significance of the scientific work on MorphoBank has been featured in the New York Times(here and here), among other publications.

== Advantages ==
Teams of scientists studying phylogenetics to build the Tree of Life assemble large spreadsheets of observations about species (referred to as "matrices"). These teams require simultaneous access by each team member to a single and secure copy of the team's data during a scientific research project. This single copy of the data also changes with great frequency during the data collection phase. Images that can be very helpful for documenting homology statements must be displayed, labeled and shared as homology statements develop. This cannot be accomplished elegantly with a desktop software package alone because in a desktop environment each collaborator is working on his own private copy of project data. Changes made by one participant cannot automatically propagate to others, preventing collaborators from seeing each other's data edits until they are manually (and due to the effort involved, often only periodically) merged into a single "true" dataset. In all but the smallest and most disciplined of teams, file version control and the reconciliation of changes made on multiple copies of the data emerge quickly as significant drags on productivity.

MorphoBank is an attempt to address these issues by leveraging the ubiquity of the web and modern web-based application techniques, including Ajax, web service layers, and rich web applications to provide a full-featured, net-accessible collaborative workspace for phylogenetic research. In particular, MorphoBank makes it easy to:

example of morphobank.org layout

- Share all kinds of data with geographically separated team members, including taxonomy, character and specimen data, media (including images, video and audio), phylogenetic matrices (including data in the widely used NEXUS and TNT format) and other data such as documents and genetic sequences.
- Label high-resolution images using a web-based image annotation application.
- Collaboratively edit project data such as phylogenetic matrices using a built-in web-based matrix editor. The editor allows the linking of labeled images to individual cells of a matrix.
- Manage access to project data. Access ranges from full-access for team members to anonymous read-only access for potential reviewers.
- Publish completed project data on the web in support of a published paper with a persistent URL.
- Search The Encyclopedia of Life for taxon exemplar images.
- Store high resolution CT data
- Create ontologies for updating and populating matrix cells.

These tasks are difficult or impossible in most existing software applications.

== History ==
In 2001 the National Science Foundation (NSF) sponsored a workshop, at the American Museum of Natural History in New York to develop the outlines of a web-based system for a collaborative, media-rich research tool for morphological phylogenetics. An application prototype presented at the workshop was later refined with feedback from the workshop and became MorphoBank version 1.0. A grant from the US National Oceanic and Atmospheric Administration funded further revisions resulting in version 2.0, released in 2005. Current support from the NSF is funding current feature enhancements to MorphoBank. MorphoBank was hosted by Stony Brook University until late October 2021 and received back up support from the American Museum of Natural History. The current version is 3.0. Rationale for the software was described in the journal Cladistics. MorphoBank has also received support from NESCENT and the San Diego Supercomputer Center. Since 2018, MorphoBank has been supported in part by Phoenix Bioinformatics, a non-profit company founded to sustain databases for the basic sciences. A permanent move of MorphoBank from Stony Brook University to Phoenix Bioinformatics was completed in late October 2021. In 2025, the original MorphoBank PHP architecture was replaced with new backend systems using Vue 3, Node.js/Express, MySQL/Aurora, and Docker. MorphoBank is free to use, publish, and read. Most projects are CC0, although other Creative Commons licensing options are available. It is supported by supporting member universities, libraries and museums.

The San Diego Supercomputer Center has previously provided technical and hosting resources to the MorphoBank project.

== Usage ==
MorphoBank hosts the products of peer-reviewed scientific research on phenotypes. An increasing volume of systematics data is "born digital" and MorphoBank is well suited to handle this type of material. On August 24, 2007, 62 active research projects were hosted by MorphoBank, as well as 6 completed (and published) projects. By 2017 over 2000 scientists and their students were registered content builders (users are not required to register and are even more numerous) and has more than 500 publicly available projects with approximately 80,000 images that are the products of scientific research. Over 1,500 active research projects are hosted by MorphoBank. The software has been used to assemble phylogenetic research on such groups as mammals, from bats to whales, bivalve molluscs, arachnids, fossil plants and living and extinct amniotes. It has also been used more broadly in evolutionary and paleontological research to host curated images associated with published research on lacewing insects geckos, raptor birds, dinosaurs, frogs and nematodes. MorphoBank is increasingly used in conjunction with the Paleobiology Database.

Example published projects:

- Project 1097: Blank CE, 2013 Origin and early evolution of photosynthetic eukaryotes in freshwater environments – reinterpreting proterozoic paleobiology and biogeochemical processes in light of trait evolution
- Project 2520: Carvalho, T. P., R. E. Reis, and J. P. Friel, 2017 A new species of Hoplomyzon (Siluriformes: Aspredinidae) from Maracaibo Basin, Venezuela: osteological description using high-resolution
- Project 2651: Baron, M. G., Norman, D. B., Barrett, P. M., 2017 A new hypothesis of dinosaur relationships and early dinosaur evolution

MorphoBank has been particularly important to the Assembling the Tree of Life initiative sponsored by the National Science Foundation. MorphoBank is well-suited to such projects because of its tools for merging taxonomic, character and matrix-based data, as well as its collaborative features. Highlights of this research include a collaborative matrix on mammal evolution published in Science that included over 4,000 phenomic characters scored for over 80 species, a matrix on extant baleen whales featuring nearly 600 images, and more.

== Citations ==
Wilson, E. O. (2003), "The encyclopedia of life", TREE, 18 (2): 77–80, Bibcode:2003TEcoE..18...77W, doi:10.1016/S0169-5347(02)00040-X.
