= PATRIC =

PATRIC (Pathosystems Resource Integration Center) was a bacterial bioinformatics website from the Bioinformatics Resource Center, originally created in 2004. It has since been combined with the Influenza Research Database and the Virus Pathogen Database and Analysis Resource Center to create the Bacterial and Viral Bioinformatics Resource Center (BV-BRC). It is an information system that integrates databases and analysis tools. It focuses on various data (transcriptomic, proteomic, structural, and biochemical) related to bacterial pathogens. PATRIC facilitates integration of various types of pathogen information to support biomedical research on bacterial infectious diseases.

== History ==
PATRIC was started as a project of Virginia Tech's Cyberinfrastructure Division and is funded by the National Institutes of Allergy and Infectious Diseases (NIAID), a component of the National Institutes of Health (NIH). PATRIC utilizes available bacterial phylogenomic data, proteomic data, and other various experiment pieces of data linked to specific pathogens from numerous sources. The PATRIC platform provides an interface for comparative genomics. In 2019, the NIAID issued further funding to Dr. Rick Stevens at the University of Chicago for the Bioinformatics Resource Center, the current umbrella under which PATRIC is contained.

=== National Microbial Pathogen Data Resource ===
The National Microbial Pathogen Data Resource was one of the eight Bioinformatics Resource Centers funded by the National Institutes of Allergy and Infectious Diseases, NIAID a component of the National Institutes of Health (NIH), which is an agency of the United States Department of Health and Human Services. The NMPDR was funded for five years from 2004 through a grant to co-PI's Rick Stevens from the Computation Institute at the University of Chicago, and Ross Overbeek at the Fellowship for the Interpretation of Genomes.

The NMPDR was initially tasked with annotating and curating the genomes of five pathogenic species of Bacteria, (Campylobacter, Listeria, Staphylococcus, Streptococcus, and Vibrio). However, after four years, the team were asked to also oversee the curation and annotation of the genomes of seven additional bacterial species (Chlamydia, Chlamydophila, Haemophilus, Mycoplasma, Neisseria, Treponema, and Ureaplasma).

It provided curated annotations in an environment for comparative analysis of genomes and biological subsystems. In addition, the NMPDR team have also developed the Rapid Annotation using Subsystems Technology Server (RAST) for annotating and curating complete microbial genomes and the Metagenomics RAST for annotating metagenomes.

As of January 2010, the bacterial organism originally covered by NMPDR under the BRC program have been transferred to PATRIC.

== Bacterial coverage ==
Data on the following bacterial species is included in PATRIC:

- Bacillus
- Bartonella
- Borrelia
- Brucella
- Burkholderia
- Campylobacter
- Chlamydia
- Clostridium
- Coxiella
- Ehrlichia
- Escherichia
- Francisella
- Helicobacter
- Listeria
- Mycobacterium
- Rickettsia
- Salmonella
- Shigella
- Staphylococcus
- Vibrio
- Yersinia
- Other Bacteria

== See also ==
- Pathogenic bacteria
- Infectious disease
- Antimicrobial Resistance databases
