= Expected progeny difference =

Concept in genetics

Expected progeny differences (EPD) are an evaluation of an animal’s genetic worth as a parent. They are based on animal models which combine all information known about an individual and its relatives to create a genetic profile of the animal’s merits. These profiles are then compared to other individuals of the same breed.

== Types of EPDs ==
An example of a set of EPDs looks like the following chart. Each set of letters stands for a specific measurement with an accuracy reading and percent rank below it. Each EPD is compared to the breed average of a given year. The number given by the EPD is the amount above or below this given average.

	CE	BW	WW	YW	MCE	Milk	MWW	Stay	CW	YG	Marb	Fat	REA	API
EPD	8	1.8	44.5	84.3	4.4	3.4	25.6	18.2	15.4	.09	.02	.00	-.05	104.4
Acc	.32	.75	.72	.68	.18	.31	.32	.11	.52	.33	.32	.43	.29	
%Rank			10	3			15		4			20		

=== Growth EPDs ===
Growth EPDs measure the amount of weight a given offspring will gain due to the parent's genetics.

Calving ease predicts the level of difficulty first time heifers will have during birth. These are determined by the percentage of unassisted births for that particular animal.

Birth weight measures how much above or below the breed's average an offspring will gain due to the parent. It does not necessarily predict the exact weight of all offspring, but instead gives a general prediction of how much extra or less weight an offspring will weigh compared to if it had been sired by another bull. High birth weight is the biggest cause of difficulty in calving, so having a bull with a low birth weight EPD is high beneficial.

Weaning and yearling weight measure the amount of weight an offspring has gained by the time it is weaned and at the one year mark. Typically the weaning weight is measured at the 205-day mark and the yearling weight is taken at the 365-day mark. Typically a larger number is favored for both of these traits.

Milk EPDs give an estimate for the maternal portion of the weaning weight that determined by milk production of the dam. It is measured in pounds of weaning weight of a bull's grandprogeny due to the milk production of the bull's daughters.

=== Reproductive EPDs ===
Scrotal circumference is an indicator of a bull's fertility. A larger circumference is preferred and is an indicator for his sons to have a larger scrotal circumference and his daughters to reach puberty sooner and therefore have calves sooner.

Gestation length is an indicator of the probability of dystocia. The longer a calf is in utero the larger it will be at birth and the greater the chance of it having dystocia. It also gives the cow a larger postpartum interval between pregnancies. A shorter gestation length is usually preferred because of this.

Stayability is an indicator EPD of longevity of a bull's daughter in a cow herd. The higher the EPD value the greater chance a cow will stay in a herd over six years and continue producing quality offspring.

=== Carcass EPDs ===
Carcass weight predicts what an animal's total retail product will be compared to other animals of that breed. It does not however predict percent retail value, or the actual amount of sellable meat that can be produced from the carcass.

Fat thickness determined the expected external and seam fat the animal will contain. These two factors contribute to the greatest waste in an animal and best way to reduce economic loss. Fat thickness EPDs can help producers reduce this loss, by using animals with mid range EPDs, so as not to have too little or too much fat.

Marbling EPDs are also important in the beef industry for predicting palatability in a beef carcass. They show the estimated USDA Quality grading System and marbling score an animal would receive if it were slaughtered. This EDP is different in that it is measured in units of marbling score, and not in weight gained by an animal. Higher values indicate the presence of genes that will produce more intramuscular fat.

== Use and accuracy ==
EPDs are used in both scientific research and in typical farm usage. Through mathematical equations and computing power EPDs can be generated for use in both situations. Through EPDs certain phenotypes can be chosen for over others. Use of EPSs and DNA markers can help when choosing certain traits over others. By using certain EPDs of an animal one can rapidly improve genetics of a herd, especially for highly heritable traits such as marbling. In addition, by using a combination of EPDs and DNA markers, EPDs can be made more accurate. When new DNA markers are used, they can help adjust the EPD according to the genotype and therefore produce a more accurate measurement.

To determine how accurate EPDs are for an individual, samples of all of a bull's offspring are looked at and compared to what their expected outcome should have been. The EPDs can then be changed based on the values that are gathered. The higher the accuracy rate, the closer most of the progeny will be to the EPD values listed. Accuracy is not an indicator of beneficial EPDs, but rather shows how close the EPD is to the true genetic potential of the animal. The closer an accuracy value is to 1, the more accurate the EPDs can be thought to be. Other factors can affect the progeny as well, such as non genetic effects including feed, weather, environment, as well as random Mendelian sampling.

In addition to the EPD and accuracy shown in a chart, often the percent rank is also given. This shows what percentile the animal ranks for the given EPD. The higher the percentile, the better the EPD is for that characteristic. The better the EPDs for a given bull, the higher chance its progeny will have a given characteristic.
