= The Arabidopsis Information Resource =

Database on Arabidopsis thaliana

The Arabidopsis Information Resource (TAIR)

Content
- Description: a community resource and online model organism database of genetic and molecular biology data for the model plant Arabidopsis thaliana, commonly known as mouse-ear cress.
- Organisms: Arabidopsis thaliana

Contact
- Research center: Phoenix Bioinformatics

Access
- Website: https://www.arabidopsis.org/

The Arabidopsis Information Resource (TAIR) is a community resource and online model organism database of genetic and molecular biology data for the model plant Arabidopsis thaliana, commonly known as mouse-ear cress.

TAIR integrates information about the Arabidopsis genome, genes, gene products, natural variants, mutant alleles and plant phenotypes and research literature. Data in TAIR can be retrieved using simple and advanced searches, bulk query and download tools, and in collections of prepared text files. The Arabidopsis genome and annotations can be visualized using the interactive SeqViewer and JBrowse tools. TAIR's biocurators are responsible for acquiring and integrating data from the research literature (functional annotation) as well as for assisting the community in using Arabidopsis data and tools. TAIR collaborates with the Arabidopsis Biological Resource Consortium (ABRC) to allow researchers to search, browse and order seed and DNA stocks. The ABRC's mission is to acquire, preserve and distribute seed and DNA resources that are useful to the Arabidopsis research community. TAIR's community includes over 28,000 registered users and the website draws about 60,000 unique visitors per month.

TAIR is supported and maintained by the nonprofit organization Phoenix Bioinformatics, and funded by subscriptions.

== TAIR funding history ==
From its inception in 1999 to 2013, TAIR was primarily funded by the National Science Foundation (Grant No. DBI-0850219). In response to the end of NSF funding, a core group of TAIR staff founded the non-profit organization, Phoenix Bioinformatics, with the aim of finding creative solutions to database sustainability.

In September 2013, with the support of Phoenix, TAIR transitioned to subscription revenues. Subscription fees are used to fund continuous data curation and improvements to TAIR's database and tools. TAIR offers a variety of subscription options to access the full, up-to-date resource.

To ensure the greatest community access to data, and promote data reuse, subscriber-only data in TAIR is made available to the public one year after its initial release on the TAIR site.

== TAIR releases ==
The A. thaliana genome was first plant genome to be completely sequenced in 2000. Since then, the genome has been periodically updated and revised to reflect changes and incorporate new information as technology advances.

- TIGR1 - Following the original Arabidopsis thaliana genome sequence published in Nature in December 2000, a standalone Arabidopsis database update released in January 2001, quickly followed by incremental updates TIGR2-3.
- TIGR4 - A major update introducing spliced alignments, UTR annotations, and alternative splicing, released in April 2003.

- TIGR5 - The final TIGR release provided in January 2004.
- TAIR6 - The first TAIR publication, released in November 2005
- TAIR7-10 - Released between 2007 and 2010, TAIR7-10 updated loci and added newly discovered genes. TAIR10 was integrated into GenBank.
- Araport11 - A complete reannotation of the entire genome released in November 2016.
- TAIR12 - The latest reannotation of the Arabidopsis thaliana genome, and the first to be completed without grant funding. Available under accession number PRJEB100887 at the European Nucleotide Archive (ENA) and National Center for Biotechnology Information (NCBI), released Feb 13, 2026.
