= FlyExpress =

Scientific database

- Stable release: v7
- Type: Bioinformatics
- License: Freeware
- Website: www.flyexpress.net

FlyExpress is a free database that collects the expression patterns of Drosophila melanogaster in embryogenesis via a series of images submitted from BDGP, Fly-FISH and publications from other researchers, containing over 100,000 images of over 4,000 genes. It is currently available freely both online and as an iPhone application.

== History ==
FlyExpress was developed by the Center of Evolutionary Medicine and Informatics of the Biodesign Institute of Arizona State University and was released in 2011 with funding and support from an NIH grant.

== Features ==
The primary images available in FlyExpress are GEMs, or Genome-wide Expression Maps, that display the spatial patterns of genes during a state of fly development via heat maps. These not only give a visual clue as to where these genes are expressed, but also how many of them are expressed in the same vicinity, as the darker regions of the heat map correlate to a higher expressed gene count.

Upon searching for images (with a gene name, PubMed ID, image ID or certain keywords), a series of GEMs are displayed from the two databases of the gene's inclusion in descending stages and views of the embryo. Various details, such as the source and experimental protocol of the embryo, are also shown. All expression patterns reflect the wild-type allele for the gene.

Categorizing genes as images does not only allow for visualization in understanding the influence of the gene, but also contrasting the patterns between multiple different genes. FlyExpress has a primary function of searching between images for similar expression patterns using a specified spatial profile via the Basic Expression Search Tool for Images (or BESTi), bringing up all images and genes that fit the criteria of the pattern.
