= Biological database =

Database of biological information

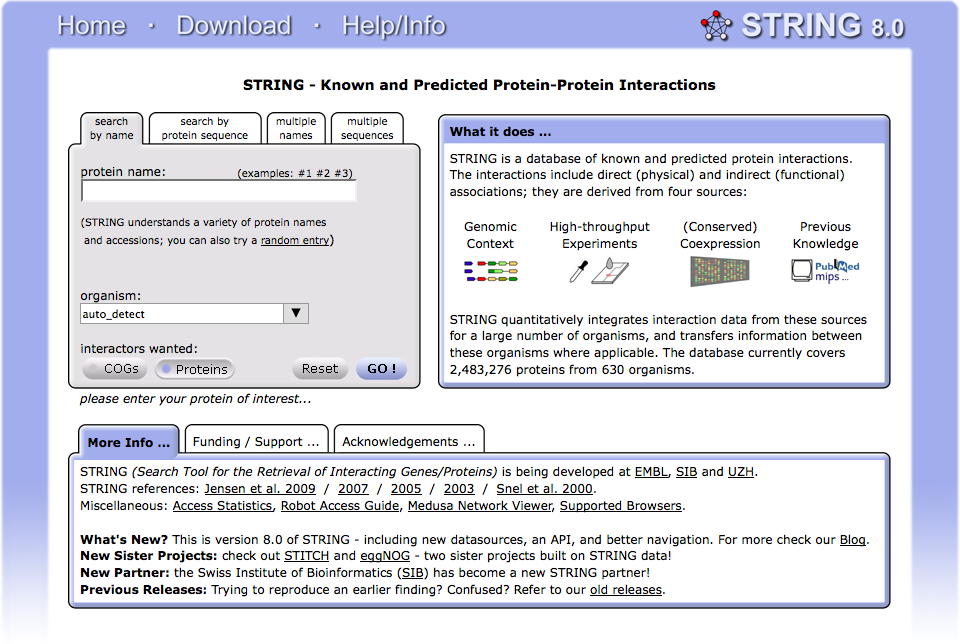
Home page of a biological database called characterises functional links between proteins

Biological databases are libraries of biological sciences, collected from scientific experiments, published literature, high-throughput experiment technology, and computational analysis. They contain information from research areas including genomics, proteomics, metabolomics, microarray gene expression, and phylogenetics. Information contained in biological databases includes gene function, structure, localization (both cellular and chromosomal), clinical effects of mutations as well as similarities of biological sequences and structures.

Biological databases can be classified by the kind of data they collect (see below). Broadly, there are molecular databases (for sequences, molecules, etc.), functional databases (for physiology, enzyme activities, phenotypes, ecology etc), taxonomic databases (for species and other taxonomic ranks), images and other media, or specimens and specimen series (for natural history museum collections, microbiological culture collections and herbaria etc.)

Databases are important tools in assisting scientists to analyze and explain a host of biological phenomena from the structure of biomolecules and their interaction, to the whole metabolism of organisms and to understanding the evolution of species. This knowledge helps facilitate the fight against diseases, assists in the development of medications, predicting certain genetic diseases and in discovering basic relationships among species in the history of life.

== Major biological databases ==
These tables cover a variety of notable biological databses across a wide swath of fields, specialties, data types, and use-cases. Many of these databases are collated in the ELIXIR Core Data Resource list which collects important European data resources critical to life science research. Specimen-focused and species-focused biodiversity databases with other information like distribution (spatial) data and ecological data are found in the List of biodiversity databases.

ELIXIR Core Data Resources
Resource	Category	Host institution	Description
ArrayExpress	Transcriptomics	EMBL-EBI / European Nucleotide Archive	Functional genomics data from high-throughput experiments
BacDive	Microbiology	Leibniz Institute DSMZ	Taxonomy, morphology, physiology, and ecology of bacterial and archaeal strains
Bgee	Transcriptomics	Swiss Institute of Bioinformatics / University of Lausanne	Gene expression patterns across multiple animal species for comparative analysis
BioImage Archive	Imaging	EMBL-EBI	Repository of biological images, supporting the deposition and reuse of reference imaging data that underpin published research across the life sciences.
BioStudies	Metadata	EMBL-EBI	Descriptions of biological studies and supplementary data linking to other archives
BRENDA	Enzymology	Leibniz Institute DSMZ	Enzyme and enzyme–ligand information curated from primary literature across all taxa
CATH	Protein Structure	University College London	Hierarchical domain classification of protein structures from the PDB
Cellosaurus	Cells	Swiss Institute of Bioinformatics	Knowledge resource describing cell lines used in biomedical research
ChEBI	Biochemistry	EMBL-EBI	Dictionary of small molecular entities of biological interest
ChEMBL	Biochemistry	EMBL-EBI	Bioactive drug-like small molecules with 2-D structures. calculated properties, and bioactivities
EGA	Genome	EMBL-EBI / CRG	Personally identifiable genetic and phenotypic data from biomedical research
EMDB	Biochemical Structure	EMBL-EBI	Cryo-EM maps and tomograms of macromolecular complexes and subcellular structures
ENA	Sequence	EMBL-EBI	Nucleotide sequencing data, sequence assemblies, and functional annotation
Ensembl	Genome	EMBL-EBI	Genome browser for vertebrate genomes supporting comparative and regulatory genomics
Ensembl Genomes	Genome	EMBL-EBI	Comparative analysis and visualisation for non-vertebrate genomes
Europe PMC	Literature	EMBL-EBI	Life-sciences articles, books, patents, and clinical guidelines
GWAS Catalog	Variation	EMBL-EBI / NHGRI	Curated collection of human genome-wide association studies
HGNC	Nomenclature	University of Cambridge / EMBL-EBI	Approved symbols, names, and families for human genes
Human Protein Atlas	Proteomics	KTH Royal Institute of Technology / Karolinska Institute / Uppsala Universitet	Human proteome mapped across cells, tissues, and organs via multi-omics and imaging
IndExs	Exsiccatae	Bavarian Natural Science Collections – Botanische Staatssammlung München	Global registry of published biological specimen series and named exsiccata works at herbaria, curated by experts
IntAct / MINT (IMEx)	Interactions	EMBL-EBI	Experimentally verified protein–protein and molecular interaction data
InterPro	Protein	EMBL-EBI	Protein families, domains, and functional sites integrated from member databases
JASPAR	Regulation	University of Oslo	Curated, non-redundant transcription factor binding profiles
MGnify	Metagenomics	EMBL-EBI	Assembly, analysis, and archiving of microbiome-derived nucleic-acid sequences
LIPID MAPS	Lipidomics	Cardiff University / UCSD / Babraham Institute / Swansea University / University of Edinburgh	Lipid structures, properties, and biological functions
LPSN	Nomenclature	Leibniz Institute DSMZ	Authoritative nomenclature of prokaryotes
Orphadata Science	Disease	Inserm / French Ministry of Health	Computable dataset of rare diseases and orphan drugs
OMA	Orthology	Swiss Institute of Bioinformatics / University of Lausanne	Inferred orthologs among complete genomes
OrthoDB	Orthology	Swiss Institute of Bioinformatics / University of Geneva	Orthologous protein-coding genes across a wide range of species
PDBe	Structure	EMBL-EBI	Biological macromolecular structures
PomBase	Genome	University of Cambridge / University College London / Babraham Institute	Structural and functional annotation for the fission yeast Schizosaccharomyces pombe
PRIDE	Proteomics	EMBL-EBI	Mass-spectrometry-based proteomics identifications, quantifications, and spectra
Reactome	Pathways	EMBL-EBI / OICR / NYU	Manually curated and peer-reviewed biological pathways
Rhea	Chemistry	Swiss Institute of Bioinformatics	Expert-curated chemical and transport reactions of biological interest
SILVA	Sequence	Leibniz Institute DSMZ	Comprehensive, quality-checked, and regularly updated datasets of aligned small and large subunit ribosomal RNA sequences for all three domains of life (Bacteria, Archaea and Eukarya)
STRING	Interactions	Swiss Institute of Bioinformatics / Novo Nordisk Foundation Center Protein Research / EMBL-EBI	Known and predicted protein–protein interactions
SWISS-MODEL	Structure	Swiss Institute of Bioinformatics / University of Basel	Automated protein structure homology modelling
UniProt	Protein	EMBL-EBI / SIB / PIR	Comprehensive protein sequence and functional annotation
VEuPathDB	Pathogens	University of Pennsylvania / University of Georgia / University of Liverpool	Genomic and functional data for eukaryotic pathogens and invertebrate disease vectors

== Access ==
Most biological databases are available through web sites that organise data such that users can browse through the data online. In addition the underlying data is usually available for download in a variety of formats. Biological data comes in many formats. These formats include text, sequence data, protein structure and links. Each of these can be found from certain sources, for example:

- Text formats are provided by PubMed and OMIM.
- Sequence data is provided by GenBank, in terms of DNA, and UniProt, in terms of protein.
- Protein structures are provided by PDB, SCOP, and CATH.

== Problems and challenges ==
Biological knowledge is distributed among countless databases. This sometimes makes it difficult to ensure the consistency of information, e.g. when different names are used for the same species or different data formats. As a consequence, inter-operability is a constant challenge for information exchange. For instance, if a DNA sequence database stores the DNA sequence along the name of a species, a name change of that species may break the links to other databases which may use a different name. Integrative bioinformatics is one field attempting to tackle this problem by providing unified access. One solution is how biological databases cross-reference to other databases with accession numbers to link their related knowledge together (e.g. so that the accession number stays the same even if a species name changes). Redundancy is another problem, as many databases must store the same information, e.g. protein structure databases also contain the sequence of the proteins they cover, their sequence, and their bibliographic information.

== Model-organism databases ==
Species-specific databases are available for some species, mainly those that are often used in research (model organisms). For example, EcoCyc is an E. coli database. Other popular model organism databases include Mouse Genome Informatics for the laboratory mouse, Mus musculus, the Rat Genome Database for Rattus, ZFIN for Danio Rerio (zebrafish), PomBase for the fission yeast Schizosaccharomyces pombe, FlyBase for Drosophila, WormBase for the nematodes Caenorhabditis elegans and Caenorhabditis briggsae, and Xenbase for Xenopus tropicalis and Xenopus laevis frogs.

== Biodiversity and species databases ==
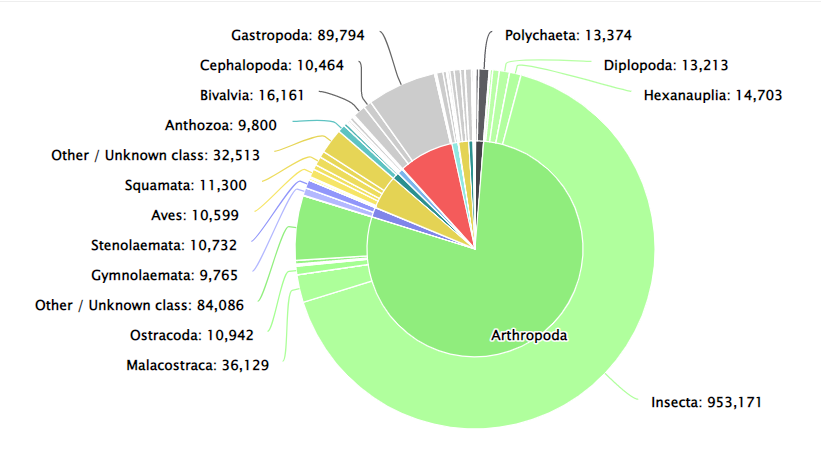
Animal groups and their number of species from the Catalogue of Life

Numerous databases attempt to document the diversity of life on earth. A prominent example is the Catalogue of Life, first created in 2001 by Species 2000 and the Integrated Taxonomic Information System. The Catalogue of Life is a collaborative project that aims to document taxonomic categorization of all currently accepted species in the world. The Catalogue of Life provides a consolidated and consistent database for researchers and policymakers to reference. The Catalogue of Life curates up-to-date datasets from other sources such as Conifer Database, ICTV MSL (for viruses), and LepIndex (for butterflies and moths). In total, the Catalogue of Life draws from 165 databases as of May 2022. Operational costs of the Catalogue of Life are paid for by the Global Biodiversity Information Facility, the Illinois Natural History Survey, the Naturalis Biodiversity Center, and the Smithsonian Institution.

Some biological databases also document geographical distribution of different species. Shuang Dai et al. created a new multi-source database to document spatial/geographical distribution of 1,371 bird species in China, as existing databases had been severely lacking in spatial distribution data for many species. Sources for this new database included books, literature, GPS tracking, and online webpage data. The new database displayed taxonomy, distribution, species info, and data sources for each species. After completion of the bird spatial distribution database, it was discovered that 61% of known species in China were found to be distributed in regions beyond where they were previously known.

== Medical databases ==
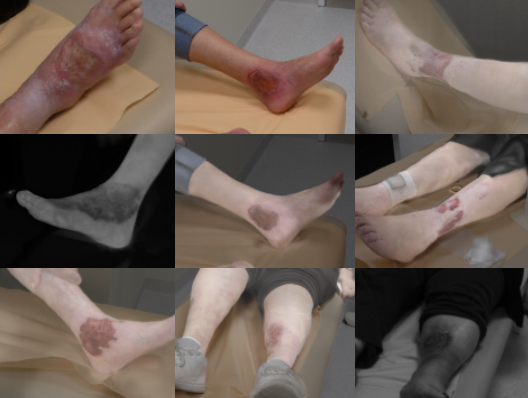
Foot wounds from WoundsDB

Medical databases are a special case of biomedical data resource and can range from bibliographies, such as PubMed, to image databases for the development of AI based diagnostic software. For instance, one such image database was developed with the goal of aiding in the development of wound monitoring algorithms. Over 188 multi-modal image sets were curated from 79 patient visits, consisting of photographs, thermal images, and 3D mesh depth maps. Wound outlines were manually drawn and added to the photo datasets. The database was made publicly available in the form of a program called WoundsDB, downloadable from the Chronic Wound Database website.

== Publications ==
Biological databases are commonly described and updated through peer-reviewed publications, which serve both as documentation and as a means of community dissemination.

A major venue for such publications is the annual Nucleic Acids Research (NAR) Database Issue, typically published in January. This special issue presents articles describing new biological databases as well as updates to existing resources, and is accompanied by the NAR online Molecular Biology Database Collection. The 2026 issue had 182 papers, 84 of which described new databases. After that year's review the collection listed 2,173 databases.

Dedicated journals focusing on biological data resources include Database: The Journal of Biological Databases and Curation and GigaScience, which publish articles describing databases, curated resources, and large-scale datasets, often alongside associated computational tools and workflows.

In addition, general data-focused journals such as Scientific Data publish descriptions of datasets across a wide range of scientific disciplines, including but not limited to the life sciences.

== See also ==
- Biobank
- Biological data
- Chemical database
- Death Domain database
- European Bioinformatics Institute
- Gene Disease Database
- Integrative bioinformatics
- List of biodiversity databases
- List of biological databases
- Model organism databases
- NCBI
- PubMed (a database of biomedical literature)
- Database: The Journal of Biological Databases and Curation
