= Biocuration =

Field dedicated to organizing and structuring biomedical data

Biocuration is the field of life sciences dedicated to organizing biomedical data, information and knowledge into structured formats, such as spreadsheets, tables and knowledge graphs. The biocuration of biomedical knowledge is made possible by the cooperative work of biocurators, software developers and bioinformaticians and is at the base of the work of biological databases.

== Biocuration as a profession ==
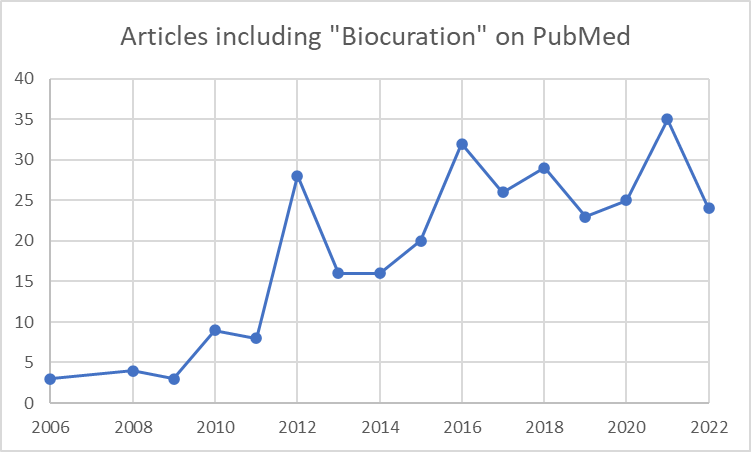
Articles about biocuration on PubMed per year since the first mention in 2006 up to the end of 2022.

A biocurator is a professional scientist who curates, collects, annotates, and validates information that is disseminated by biological and model organism databases. It is a new profession, with the first mentions in the scientific literature dating of 2006 in the context of the work in databases like the Immune Epitope Database and Analysis Resource. Biocurators usually are PhD-level with a mix of experiences in wet lab and computational representations of knowledge (e.g. via ontologies).

The role of a biocurator encompasses quality control of primary biological research data intended for publication, extracting and organizing data from original scientific literature, and describing the data with standard annotation protocols and vocabularies that enable powerful queries and biological database interoperability. Biocurators communicate with researchers to ensure the accuracy of curated information and to foster data exchanges with research laboratories.

Biocurators are present in diverse research environments, but may not self-identify as biocurators. Projects such as ELIXIR (the European life-sciences Infrastructure for biological Information) and GOBLET (Global Organization for Bioinformatics Learning, Education and Training) promote training and support biocuration as a career path.

In 2011, biocuration was already recognized as a profession, but there were no formal degree courses to prepare curators for biological data in a targeted fashion. With the growth of the field, the University of Cambridge and the EMBL-EBI started to jointly offer a Postgraduate Certificate in Biocuration, considered as a step towards recognising biocuration as a discipline on its own. There is a perceived increase in demand of biocuration, and a need for additional biocuration training by graduate programs.

Organizations that employ biocurators, like Clinical Genome Resource (ClinGen), often provide specialized materials and training for biocuration.

== Biological knowledgebases ==
The role of biocurators is best known among the field of biological knowledgebases. Such databases, like UniProt and PDB rely on professional biocurators to organize information. Among other things, biocurators work to improve the data quality, for example, by merging duplicated entries.

An important part of those knowledgebases are model organisms databases, which rely on biocurators to curate information regarding organisms of particular kinds. Some notable examples of model organism databases are FlyBase, PomBase, and ZFIN, dedicated to curate information about Drosophila, Schizosaccharomyces pombe and zebrafish respectively.

== Curation and annotation ==
Biocuration is the integration of biological information into on-line databases in a semantically standardized way, using appropriate unique traceable identifiers, and providing necessary metadata including source and provenance.

=== Ontologies, controlled vocabularies and standard names ===
Biocurators commonly employ and take part in the creation and development of shared biomedical ontologies: structured, controlled vocabularies that encompass many biological and medical knowledge domains, such as the Open Biomedical Ontologies. These domains include genomics and proteomics, anatomy, animal and plant development, biochemistry, metabolic pathways, taxonomic classification, and mutant phenotypes. Given the variety of existing ontologies, there are guidelines that orient researchers on how to choose a suitable one.

The Unified Medical Language System is one such systems that integrates and distributes millions of terms used in the life sciences domain.

Biocurators enforce the consistent use of gene nomenclature guidelines and participate in the genetic nomenclature committees of various model organisms, often in collaboration with the HUGO Gene Nomenclature Committee (HGNC). They also enforce other nomenclature guidelines like those provided by the Nomenclature Committee of the International Union of Biochemistry and Molecular Biology (IUBMB), one example of which is the Enzyme Commission EC number.

More generally, the use of persistent identifiers is praised by the community, so to improve clarity and facilitate knowledge

=== DNA annotation ===
In genome annotation for example, the identifiers defined by the ontologists and consortia are used to describe parts of the genome. For example, the gene ontology (GO) curates terms for biological processes, which are used to describe what we know about specific genes.

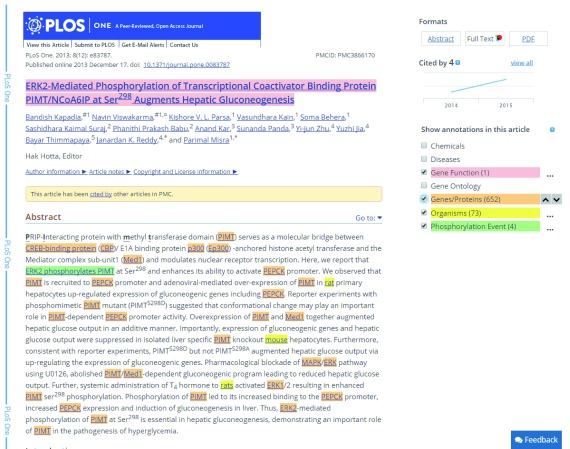
Annotations of a biomedical text in the Europe PMC SciLite platform

=== Text annotation ===
As of 2021, life sciences communication is still done primarily via free natural languages, like English or German, which hold a degree of ambiguity and make it hard to connect knowledge. So, besides annotating biological sequences, biocurators also annotate texts, linking words to unique identifiers. This aids in disambiguation, clarifying the meaning intended, and making the texts processable by computers. One application of text annotation is to specify the exact gene a scientist is referring to.

Publicly available text annotations make it possible to biologists to take further advantage of biomedical text. The Europe PMC has an Application Programming Interface which centralizes text annotations from a variety of sources and make them available in a Graphic User Interface called SciLite. The PubTator Central also provides annotations, but is fully based on computerized text-mining and does not provide a user interface. There are also programs that allow users to manually annotate the biomedical texts they are interested, such as the ezTag system.

=== Variant Curation ===
A type of biocuration within the field of medical genetics, variant curation is a process for assessment of genetic changes according to the likelihood that they may cause disease. This is an evidence-based process that uses data from a multitude of sources. These sources can include population data, computational data, functional data, segregation data, de novo data, allelic data, among others. It is a collaborative process that can be automated, however manual curation is considered to be the gold standard.

There is no single standardised process of variant curation; different researchers and organisations use different variant curation processes. However, a set of internationally accepted standards and guidelines for the interpretation of genetic variants have been jointly developed by the American College of Medical Genetics and the Association for Molecular Pathology. These are known as the ACMG/AMP guidelines. These guidelines provide a framework for classifying genetic variants as "pathogenic", "likely pathogenic", "uncertain significance", "likely benign" or "benign", in order from most likely to cause disease to least likely to cause disease. The guidelines also list various levels of evidence ranging from very strong, strong, moderate or supporting. The combination of types of evidence found, and the levels in which those pieces of evidence exist, allows for each variant to be classified along the scale from "pathogenic" to "benign".

== International Society for Biocuration (ISB) ==
The International Society for Biocuration (ISB) is a non-profit organisation that "promotes the field of biocuration and provides a forum for information exchange through meetings and workshops." It has grown from the International Biocuration Conferences and was founded in early 2009.

The ISB offers the Biocuration Career Award to biocurators in the community: the Biocurator Career Award (given annually) and the ISB Award for Exceptional Contributions to Biocuration (given biannually).

The official journal of the ISB, Database, is a venue specialized in articles about databases and biocuration.

== Community curation ==
Traditionally, biocuration has been done by dedicated experts, which integrate data into databases. Community curation has emerged as a promising approach to improve the dissemination of knowledge from published data and provide a cost-effective way to improve the scalability of biocuration. In some cases, community help is leveraged in jamborees that introduce domain experts to curation tasks, carried during the event, while others rely on asynchronous contributions of experts and non-experts.

=== Biological databases ===
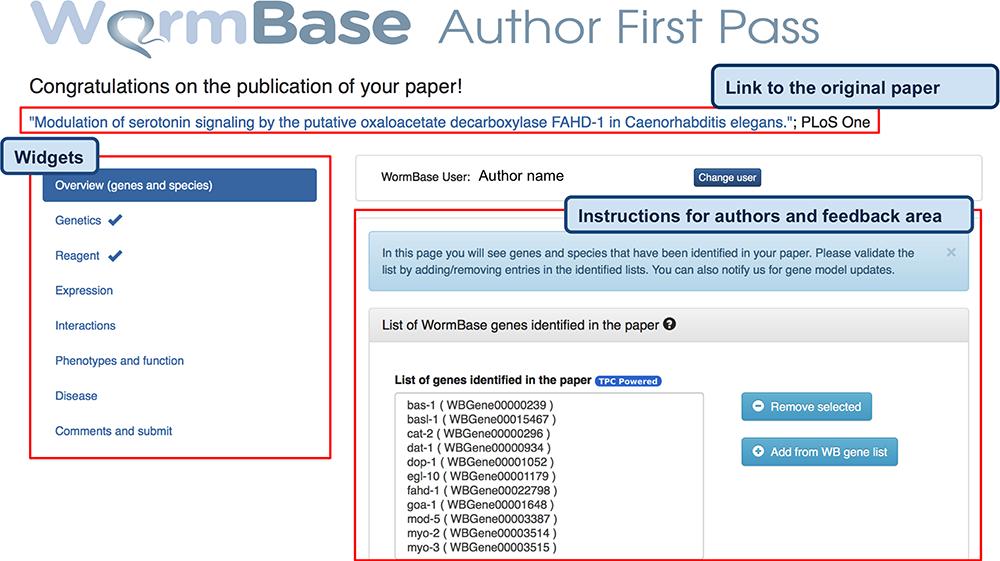
Community curation portal of WormBase

Several biological databases include author contributions in their functional curation strategy to some extent, which may range from associating gene identifiers with publications or free-text, to more structured and detailed annotation of sequences and functional data, outputting curation to the same standards as professional biocurators. Most community curation at Model Organism Databases involves annotation by original authors of published research (first-pass annotation) to effectively obtain accurate identifiers for objects to be curated, or identify data-types for detailed curation. For example:

- WormBase successfully solicits first-pass annotation from users and has integrated author curation with the micropublication process. WormBase also integrates text-mining to its platform, providing suggestions to community curators.
- FlyBase sends email requests to authors of new publications, inviting them to list the genes and data types described via an online tool and has also mobilized the community to write gene summary paragraphs.

Other databases, such as PomBase, rely on publication authors to submit highly detailed, ontology-based annotations for their publications, and meta-data associated with genome-wide data-sets using controlled vocabularies. A web-based tool Canto; was developed to facilitate community submissions. Since Canto is freely available, generic and highly configurable, it has been adopted by other projects. Curation is subjected to review by professional curators resulting in high quality in-depth curation of all molecular data-types.

The widely used UniProt knowledgebase also has a community curation mechanism that allows researchers to add information about proteins.

=== Wiki-style resources ===
Bio-wikis rely on their communities to provide content and a series of wiki-style resources are available for biocuration. AuthorReward, for example, is an extension to MediaWiki that quantifies researchers' contributions to biology wikis. RiceWiki was an example of a wiki-based database for community curation of rice genes equipped with AuthorReward. CAZypedia is another such wiki for community biocuration of information on carbohydrate-active enzymes (CAZys).

The WikiProteins/WikiProfessional was a project to semantically organize biological data led by Barend Mons. The 2007 project had direct contributions of Jimmy Wales, Wikipedia co-founder, and took Wikidata as an inspiration. A currently active project that runs on an adaptation of mediawiki software is WikiPathways, which crowdsources information about biological pathways.

==== Wikipedia ====
There is some overlap between the work of biocurators and Wikipedia, with boundaries between scientific databases and Wikipedia becoming increasingly blurred. Databases like Rfam and the Protein Data Bank for example make heavy use of Wikipedia and its editors to curate information. However, most databases offer highly structured data that is searchable in complex combinations, which is usually not possible on Wikipedia, although Wikidata aims at solving this problem to some extent.

The Gene Wiki project used Wikipedia for collaborative curation of thousands of genes and gene products, such as titin and insulin. Several projects also employ Wikipedia as a platform for curation of medical information.

One other way that Wikipedia is used for biocuration is via its list articles. For example, the Comprehensive Antibiotic Resistance Database integrates its assessment of databases about antibiotic resistance to a particular Wikipedia list.

==== Wikidata ====
The Wikimedia knowledge base Wikidata is increasingly being used by the biocuration community as an integrative repository across life sciences. Wikidata is being seen by some as an alternative with better prospects of maintenance and interoperability than smaller independent biological knowledge bases.

Wikidata has been used to curate information on SARS-CoV-2 and the COVID-19 pandemic and by the Gene Wiki project to curate information about genes. Data from biocuration on Wikidata is reused on external resources via SPARQL queries. Some projects use curation via Wikidata as a path to improve life-sciences information on Wikipedia.

=== Gamified resources ===
An approach to involve the crowd in biocuration is via gamified platforms that use game design principles to boost engagement. A few examples are:

- Mark2Cure, a gamified platform for community curation of biomedical abstracts
- Cochrane Crowd, a platform by Cochrane for curation of clinical trials and to categorize and summarize biomedical literature.
- CIViC, a portal for annotation of genomic variants related to cancer which tracks scores and keeps leaderboards.
- APICURON, a database to credit and acknowledge the work of biocurators, that collects and aggregates biocuration events from third party resources and generates achievements and leaderboards.

== Computational text mining for curation ==
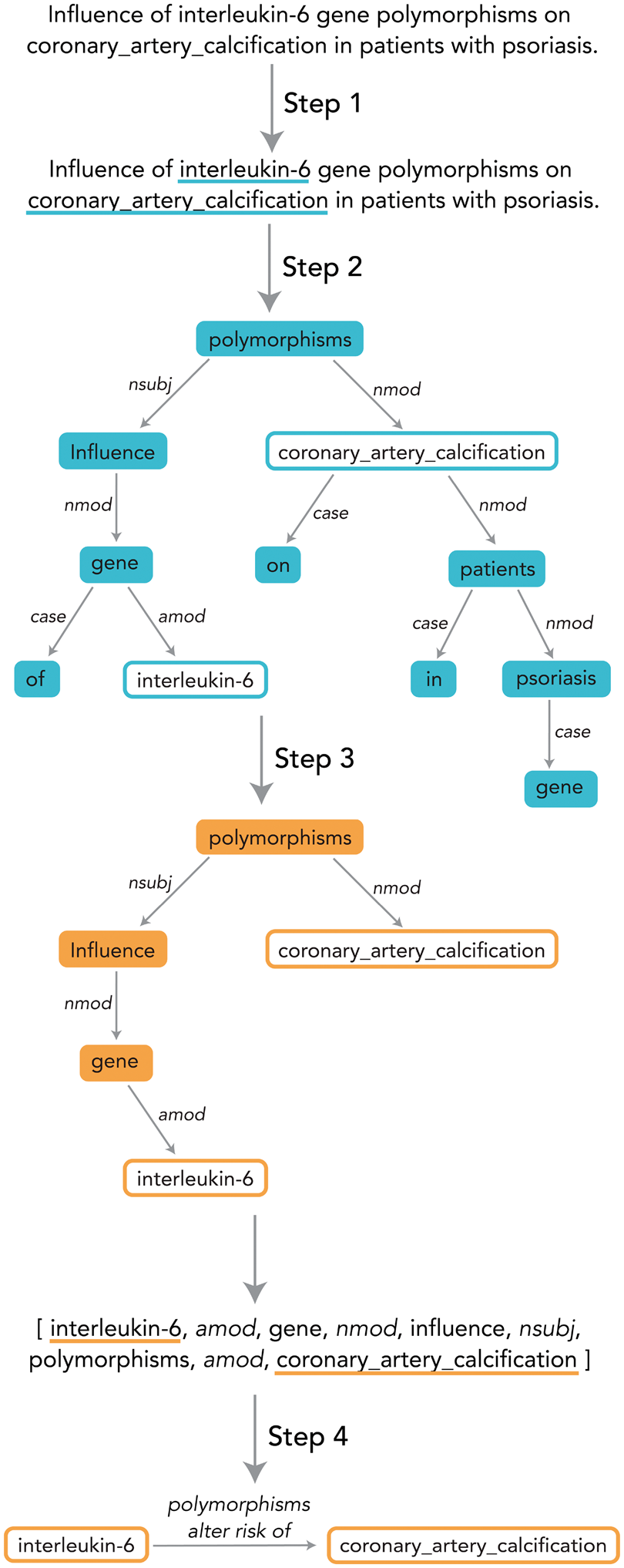
Example of extraction of a biomedical statement from unstructured language

Natural-language processing and text mining technologies can help biocurators extract information for manual curation. Text mining can scale curation efforts, supporting the identification of gene names, for example, as well as for partially inferring ontologies. The conversion of unstructured assertions to structured information makes use of techniques like named entity recognition and parsing of dependencies. Text-mining of biomedical concepts faces challenges regarding variations in reporting, and the community is working to increase the machine-readability of articles.

During the COVID-19 pandemic, biomedical text mining was heavily used to cope with the large amount of published scientific research about the topic (over 50.000 articles).

The popular NLP python package SpaCy has a modification for biomedical texts, SciSpaCy, which is maintained by the Allen Institute for AI.

Among the challenges for text-mining applied to biocuration is the difficulty of accessing full texts of biomedical articles due to pay walls, linking the challenges of biocuration to those of the open-access movement.

A complementary approach to biocuration via text mining involves applying optical character recognition to biomedical figures, coupled to automatic annotation algorithms. This has been used to extract gene information from pathway figures, for example.

Suggestions to improve the written text to facilitate annotations range from using controlled natural languages to providing clear association of concepts (such as genes and proteins) with the particular species of interest.

While challenges remain, text-mining is already an integral part of the workflow of biocuration in several biological knowledgebases.

=== Biocreative challenges ===
The BioCreAtivE (Critical Assessment of Information Extraction systems in Biology) Challenge is a community-wide effort to develop and evaluate text mining and information extraction systems for the life sciences. The challenge was first launched in 2004 and has since become an important event in the biocuration and bioinformatics communities. The main goal of the challenge is to foster the development of advanced computational tools that can effectively extract information from the vast amount of biological data available.

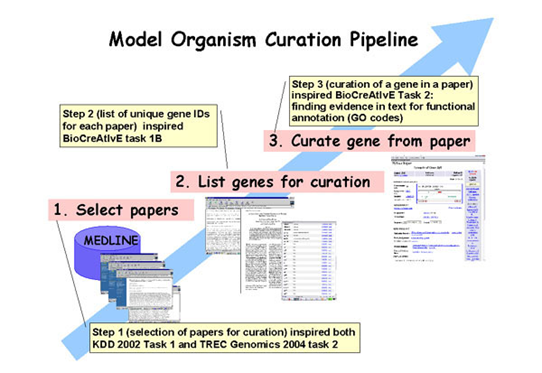
Typical pipeline for biological curation

The BioCreative Challenge is organized into several subtasks that cover various aspects of text mining and information extraction in the life sciences. These subtasks include gene normalization, relation extraction, entity recognition, and document classification. Participants in the challenge are provided with a set of annotated data to develop and test their systems, and their performance is evaluated based on various metrics, such as precision, recall, and F-score.

The BioCreative Challenge has led to the development of many innovative text mining and information extraction systems that have greatly improved the efficiency and accuracy of biocuration efforts. These systems have been integrated into many biocuration pipelines and have helped to speed up the curation process and enhance the quality of curated data.

== See also ==
- AgBase
- Biological database
- Digital curation
- International Society for Biocuration
- Model Organism Database
- OBO Foundry
