= Gerhard Ecker =

Austrian medicinal chemist

Gerhard F. Ecker
- Born: Seitenstetten
- Known for: Medicinal Chemistry; Pharmacoinformatics; Open PHACTS
- Scientific career
- Workplaces: University of Vienna
- Website: pharminfo.univie.ac.at

Gerhard F. Ecker is an Austrian medicinal chemist and expert in the fields of Pharmacoinformatics at the University of Vienna, where he is the Professor for Pharmacoinformatics and Head of the Pharmacoinformatics Research Group at the Department of Medicinal Chemistry. He also coordinates the research focus "Computational Life Sciences" of the Faculty of Life Sciences.

== Career ==
Ecker received his doctorate in natural sciences from the University of Vienna in 1991, became appointed Associate Professor for Medicinal Chemistry in 1998 and Full Professor for Pharmacoinformatics in 2009.

Ecker is Editor of Molecular Informatics and coordinates the EUROPIN PhD programme in Pharmacoinformatics. He has also been President of the European Federation for Medicinal Chemistry (now European Federation for Medicinal Chemistry and Chemical Biology) from 2009 to 2011.

== Research ==
Ecker's research focuses on computational drug design which not only led to the identification of highly active propafenone-type inhibitors of P-glycoprotein, but also paved the way for development of new descriptors and virtual screening approaches for identification of new scaffolds active at P-gp. With the increasing knowledge on the importance of P-gp for ADME, his interest moved towards the prediction of P-gp substrate properties. Around 2010 he extended the studies also on other antitargets, such as the hERG potassium channel, as well as on the serotonin transporter, the GABA receptor and the insulin receptor.
