= Pharmacy (shop) =

Shop that provides pharmaceutical drugs

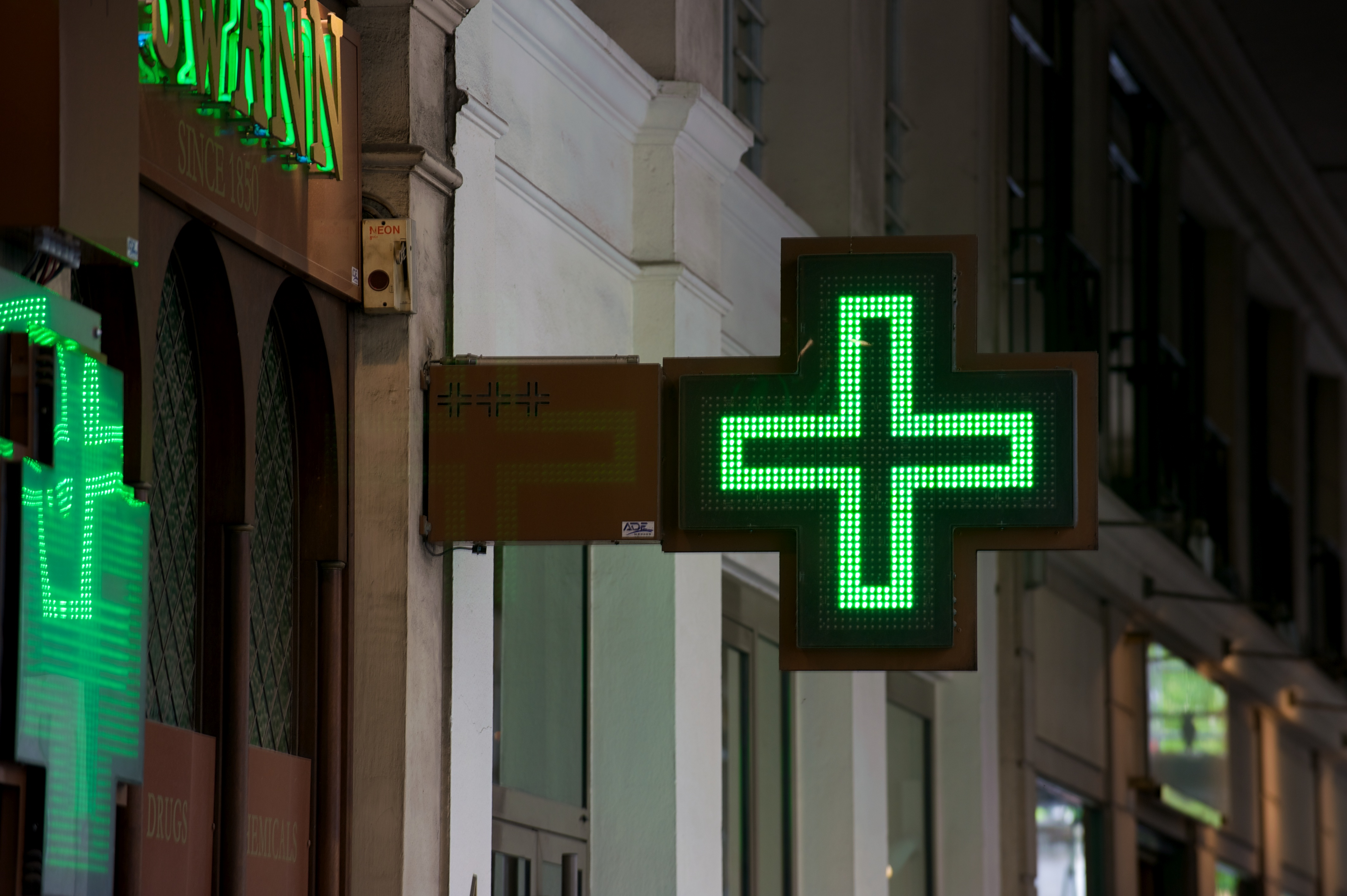
A green cross is the symbol of pharmacies in many European countries.

A pharmacy (also called drugstore in North American English or community pharmacy or chemist in Commonwealth English and both in Australian English) is a premises which provides pharmaceutical drugs, among other products. At the pharmacy, a pharmacist oversees the fulfillment of medical prescriptions and is available to counsel patients about prescription and over-the-counter drugs or about health problems and wellness issues. A typical pharmacy would be in the commercial area of a community.

== Brick and mortar pharmacies ==
In most countries, a premises for prescription drugs is subject to legislation; with requirements for storage conditions, staff qualifications, equipment, record keeping (especially of controlled drugs) and other matters, all specified in legislation. It was once the case that pharmacists stayed within the premises compounding/dispensing medications, but there has been an increasing trend towards the use of trained pharmacy technicians, with the pharmacist spending more time communicating with patients. Pharmacy technicians are now more dependent upon automation to assist them in their new role dealing with patients' prescriptions and patient safety issues.

Pharmacies are typically required to have a qualified pharmacist on-duty at all times when they are open. It is also often a requirement for the owner of a pharmacy to be a registered pharmacist, but that is not the case in all jurisdictions: where permitted, many retailers (including supermarkets and mass merchandisers) now include a pharmacy as a department of their store.

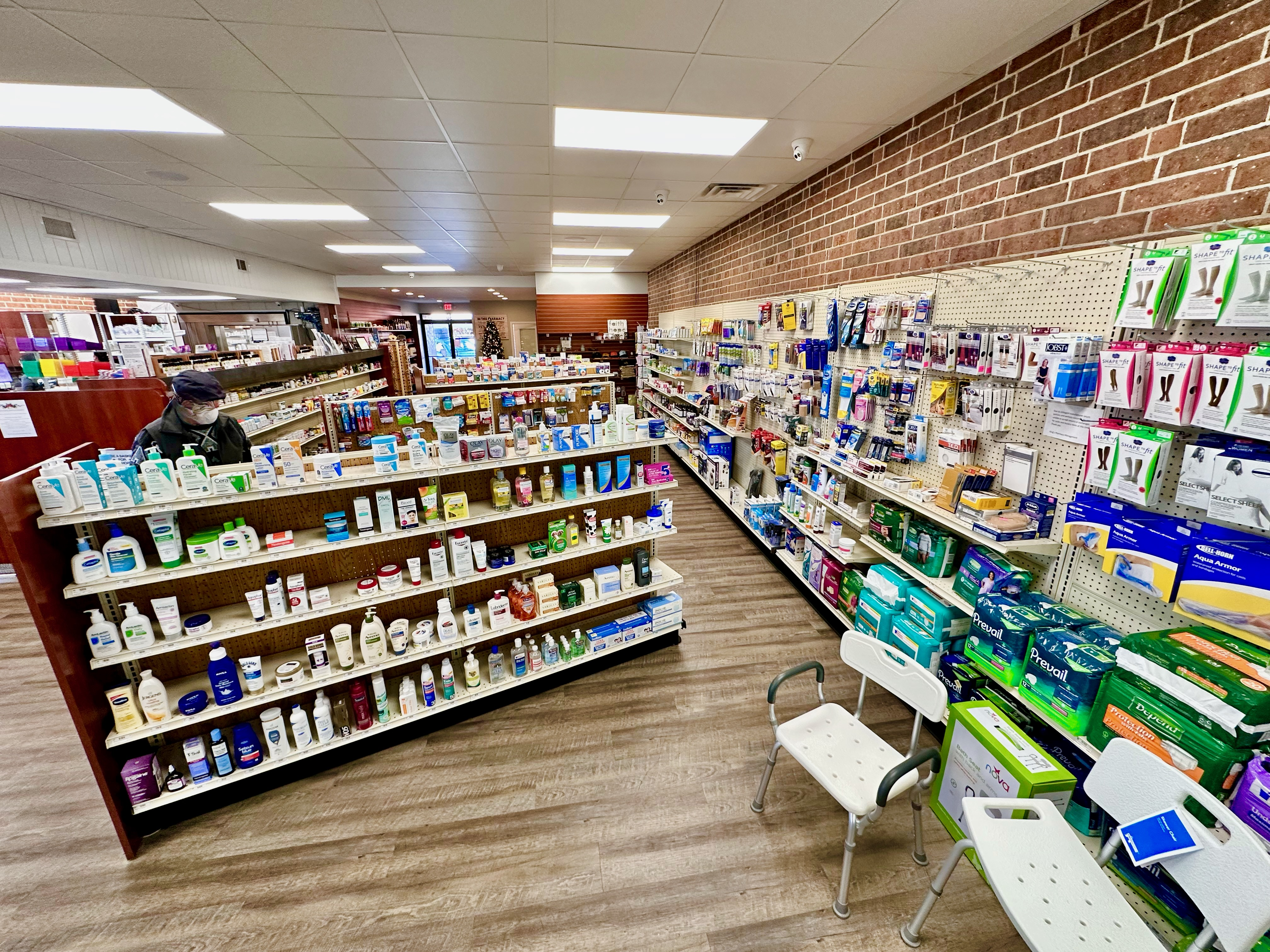
The interior of a modern pharmacy in the United States

Community pharmacies are often able to provide more personalized care to local members of their community and offer services such as Medication Therapy Management (MTM), Medication Synchronization, and compounding. With the aid of pharmacy management systems and different integrated technologies, these smaller pharmacies are able to keep up with their large-scale competition.

== Online pharmacies ==
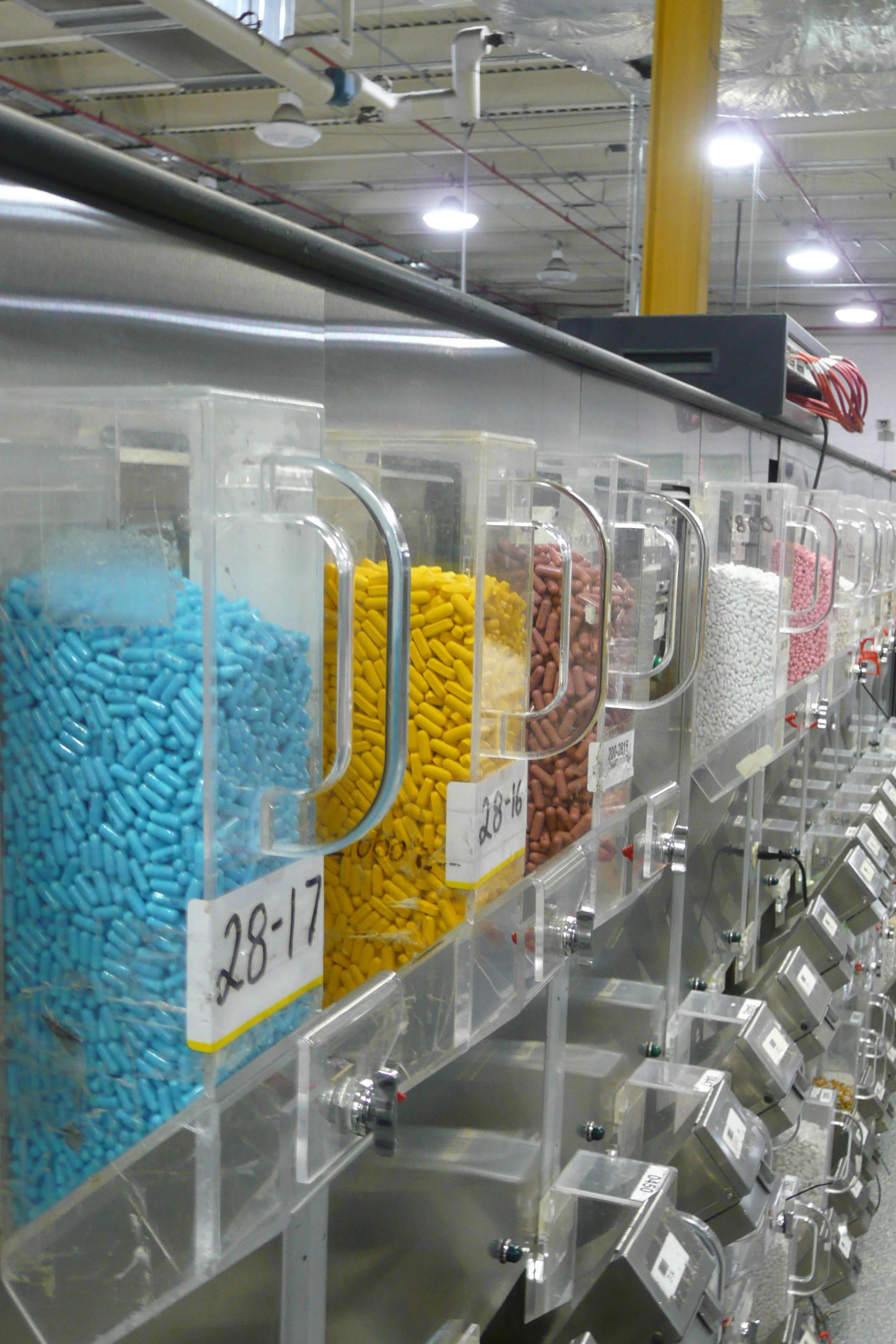
Canisters of pills from a mail order pharmacy

Since about the year 2000, a growing number of online pharmacies have been established worldwide. Many of these pharmacies are similar to community pharmacies, and in fact, many of them are actually operated by brick-and-mortar community pharmacies that serve consumers online and those that walk in their door. The primary difference is the method by which the medications are requested and received. Some customers consider this to be more convenient and private method rather than traveling to a community drugstore where another customer might overhear about the drugs that they take. Internet pharmacies (also known as online pharmacies) are also recommended to some patients by their physicians if they are home-bound.

While most Internet pharmacies sell prescription drugs and require a valid prescription, some Internet pharmacies sell prescription drugs without requiring a prescription. Some customers order drugs from online pharmacies to avoid the "inconvenience" of visiting a doctor, or to obtain medications which their doctors were unwilling to prescribe. However, this practice has been criticized as potentially dangerous, especially by those who feel that only doctors can reliably assess contraindications, risk/benefit ratios, and an individual's overall suitability for use of medication. There also have been reports of such pharmacies dispensing substandard products. Of particular concern with Internet pharmacies is the ease with which people can obtain controlled substances via the Internet without a prescription issued by a doctor/practitioner who has an established doctor-patient relationship. There are instances where an online doctor issues a prescription, for a controlled substance to a "patient" s/he has never met.

=== By country ===
In the United States, in order for a prescription for a controlled substance to be valid, it must be issued for a legitimate medical purpose by a licensed practitioner acting in the course of legitimate doctor-patient relationship. The filling pharmacy has a corresponding responsibility to ensure that the prescription is valid. Often, individual state laws outline what defines a valid patient-doctor relationship. The Food and Drug Administration (FDA) is also heavily involved in monitoring internet pharmacies and has issued warnings against several companies who have violated the U.S. Federal Food, Drug, and Cosmetic Act that protects individuals against rogue online pharmacies. In the United States, there has been a push to legalize the importation of medications from Canada and other countries, in order to reduce consumer costs. While in most cases importation of prescription medications violates FDA regulations and federal laws, enforcement is generally targeted at international drug suppliers, rather than consumers. There is no known case of any U.S. citizens buying Canadian drugs for personal use with a prescription, who has ever been charged by authorities.

Canada is home to dozens of licensed Internet pharmacies, many of which sell their lower-cost prescription drugs to U.S. consumers (who must otherwise pay one of the world's highest drug prices). In recent years, many consumers in the US (and in other countries with high drug costs), have turned to licensed Internet pharmacies in India, Israel, and the UK, which often have even lower prices than in Canada.

== Ethical standards ==
Community pharmacists’ understanding of ethics, confidentiality, patient autonomy, trustworthiness and reliability are essential in community practice and must influence their decision making should an ethical dilemma arise. In some countries, community pharmacists may be asked to compromise on their values and ethical issues may arise not only because of patient's or physician's request but may also because of their employers' intrusion. Individual factors such as age, gender, work experience, and educational level and organizational factors such as the number of pharmacists in a pharmacy and location of pharmacy may affect the ethical perspectives of community pharmacists. Pharmacies have been criticized for selling in some cases homeopathic products.

== Duties and Responsibilities ==
The International Pharmaceutical Federation has declared their vision of a community-based pharmacist:

- An expert in pharmaceutical care, pharmacotherapy and health promotion
- A professional communicator with patients, other healthcare providers and decision makers
- Deliver high quality products, services and communication
- Document their work and communicate the outcome to professional colleagues.

Community-based pharmacists' responsibilities include: checking and dispensing of prescription drugs, providing advice on drug selection and usage to doctors and other health professionals and counseling patients in health promotion, disease prevention and the proper use of medicines.

In most countries regulations govern how dispensaries may operate, with specific requirements for storage conditions, equipment and record keeping.

== Dispensing or compounding ==
Most drugs are commercially made at factories and dispensed by pharmacies. Drugs that are not commercially made must be compounded from other ingredients. In 1930, 75% of medications were compounded, but by 1970 only 1% were compounded.

== Support staff ==
To help pharmacists be able to take on extended roles, it is common for them to work as part of a team that can include pharmacy technicians, dispensing assistants and counter assistants.

== Ownership ==
In parts of mainland Europe, the pharmacist is required to own the pharmacy of which she or he is the licensee. Under this arrangement, a pharmacist can be the operator of only a single outlet. In the UK, 60% of all community pharmacies are owned by companies that own multiple pharmacies.

In the United States, more than 25% of independent owners have ownership in two or more pharmacies.

Most of Australia's and New Zealand's community pharmacies are owner-operated. In Australia, pharmacists recognise the need to integrate professional pharmacy services into the health system to meet the changing health care needs of the population.

== Society and culture ==
A survey conducted by PrescribeWellness found that almost half of Americans older than 40 years-old value pharmacies that offer preventative care services, and would be willing to transfer their prescriptions to pharmacies that offer those services. Patients also value pharmacies where they can receive medical advice concerning their prescription medications, how those medications may interact with each other, and receive over-the-counter drug recommendations for the management of common ailments. In a survey of over 1,000 U.S. adults older than 40 years-old conducted by Propeller Insights, 67% of patients responded that they would prefer that their pharmacist discuss new prescriptions with them, rather than their physician, because they viewed their pharmacist as "better at explaining side effects and has more time to spend with them."

The American Association of Colleges of Pharmacy recommends that consumers choose a pharmacy at which they can have a consulting relationship with the pharmacist. Anyone using drugs benefits when they have easier access to a pharmacist. Being timely includes both processing the request quickly and having drug stock available to fill the prescription. Some consumers need drugs delivered to their home, perhaps by mail, and may select a pharmacy that offers that service. Different pharmacies may charge different prices for the same drugs, so shopping for lower prices may identify a pharmacy offering better value. In addition to fulfilling prescriptions, a pharmacy might offer preventive healthcare services like vaccinations. Up-to-date technology at a pharmacy can assist a patient with prescription reminders and alerts about potential negative drug interactions, thereby reducing medical errors.

== By country ==
=== In United Kingdom ===
It is becoming more common for pharmacists to take on extended roles that provide more clinical care directly to patients as part of a primary care team. There are around 11,400 community pharmacies in England. Many are open for extended hours in the evenings and weekends and they are accessible without appointment.

In the English NHS there were 438 million visits nationally to community pharmacies for health related reasons in 2015. More than 1.1 billion prescription items were dispensed in 2022. More than £10 billion is spent on prescribed drugs annually. Under the 2005 NHS Community Pharmacy contract all community pharmacists in England and Wales provide:

- Dispensing Service
- Repeat Dispensing Service: This allows the patient to collect regular repeat prescription medicines for an agreed period of time, without having to go back to their GP
- Disposal of Unwanted Medicines.
- Promotion of Healthy Lifestyles.
- Signposting to other Services.
- Support for Self-Care: advice on treating minor illnesses and long term conditions.

Widely available Advanced Services:

- Medicines Use Review & Prescription Intervention.
- New Medicine Service. For patients who have been given their first prescription for a medicine to treat Asthma and COPD, Type 2 diabetes, Hypertension or Anticoagulant Therapy.
- Appliance Use Review Service.
- Flu Vaccination.

Enhanced Services which are not available unless locally commissioned:

- Minimising Adverse Effects and Admissions Related to Medicines.
- Discharge and Transfer Planning.
- Managing Dental Pain.

The introduction of the digital hospital-to-pharmacy referral service, which was to launch in July 2020, as part of the new community pharmacy contract, was postponed to 15 February 2021 because of the COVID-19 pandemic in England. It will enable hospitals to digitally notify community pharmacies when patients are discharged and may need advice on taking new medicines, and about changes to their prescriptions.

In 2022 the average pharmacy carried out around 19 consultations per day, averaging 5.6 minutes each - about 65 million consultations across 10,800 pharmacies in the year.

=== In Vietnam ===
According to IQVIA, Vietnam had 55,300 drugstores in 2016, of which 185 belonged to modern drugstore chains. In 2021, the total number of drugstores decreased to 44,600, but the number of drugstores in modern chains increased to 1,600. According to a report by VNDIRECT Securities Company, Vietnam had about 70,000 drugstores in 2022, including 59,000 traditional retail drugstores (accounting for 84%) and 11,000 chain drugstores (accounting for 16%). The revenue of Vietnam's pharmaceutical retail market reached about 80,000 billion VND. According to a report by MBS Securities Company in 2023, the size of Vietnam's pharmaceutical market is about 6-7 billion USD, with more than 3,000 modern chain drugstores.

== Gallery ==
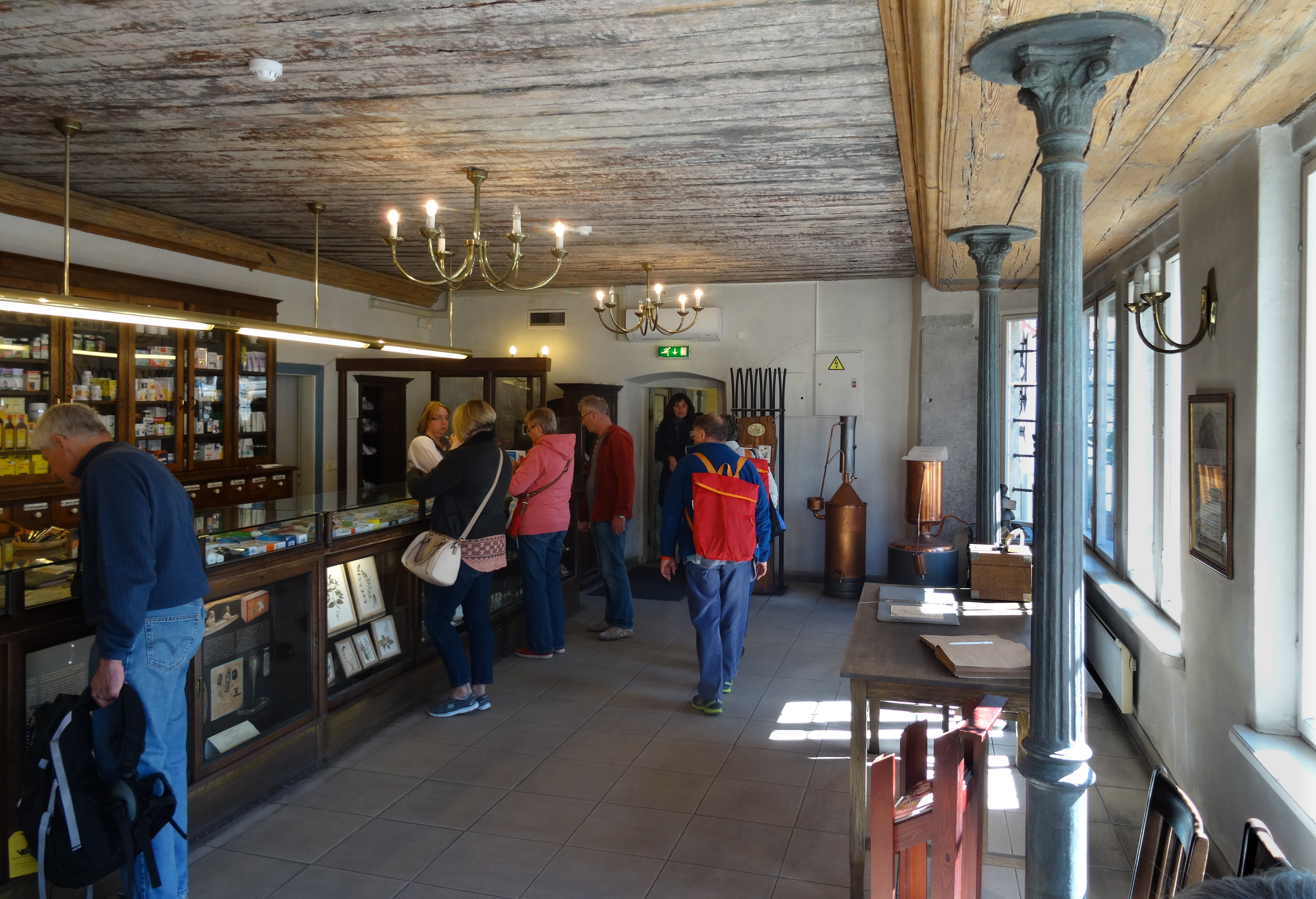
Interior of the Town Hall Pharmacy in Tallinn, operating continuously from at least 1422

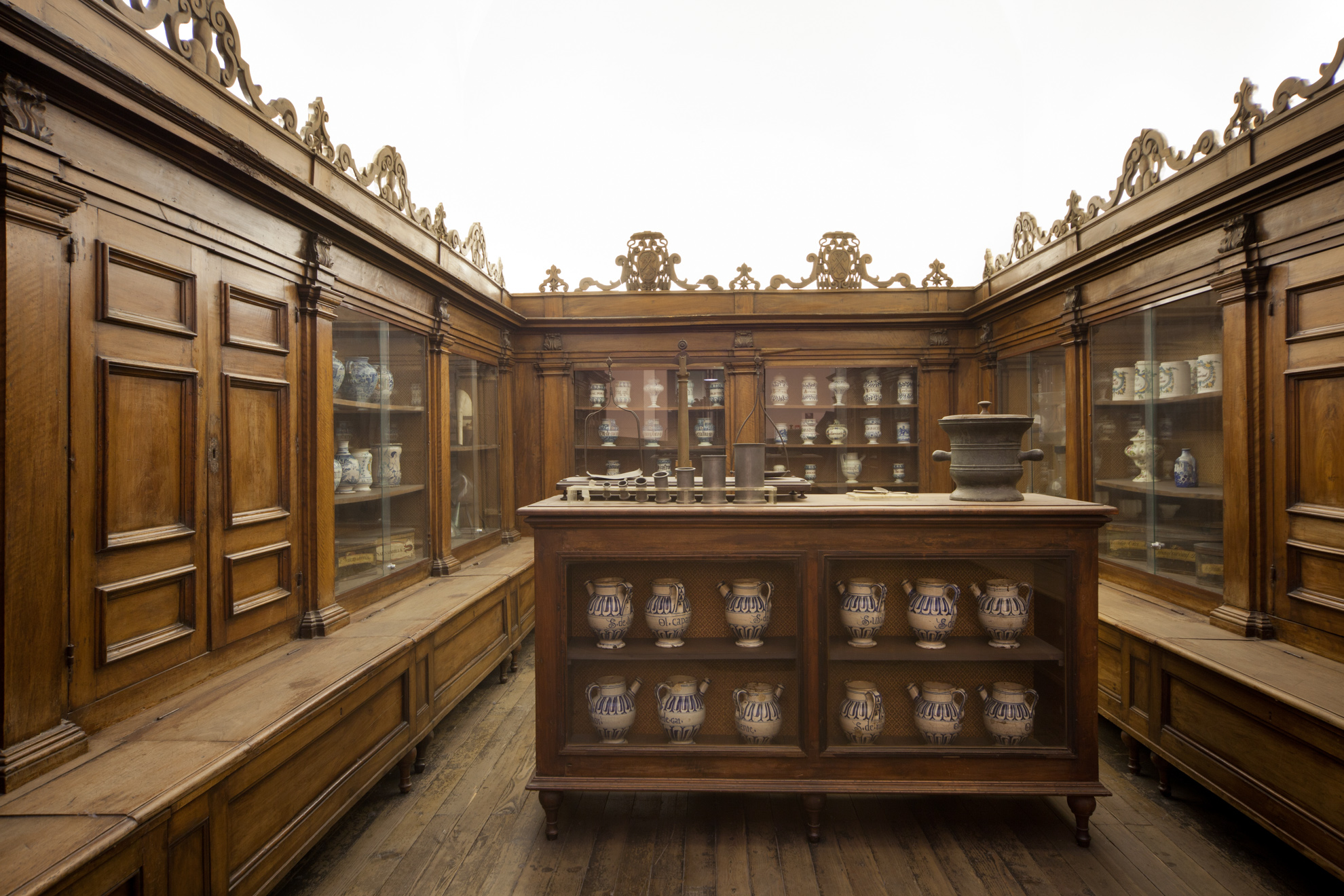
Convent pharmacy exhibited at the Museo nazionale della scienza e della tecnologia Leonardo da Vinci of Milan

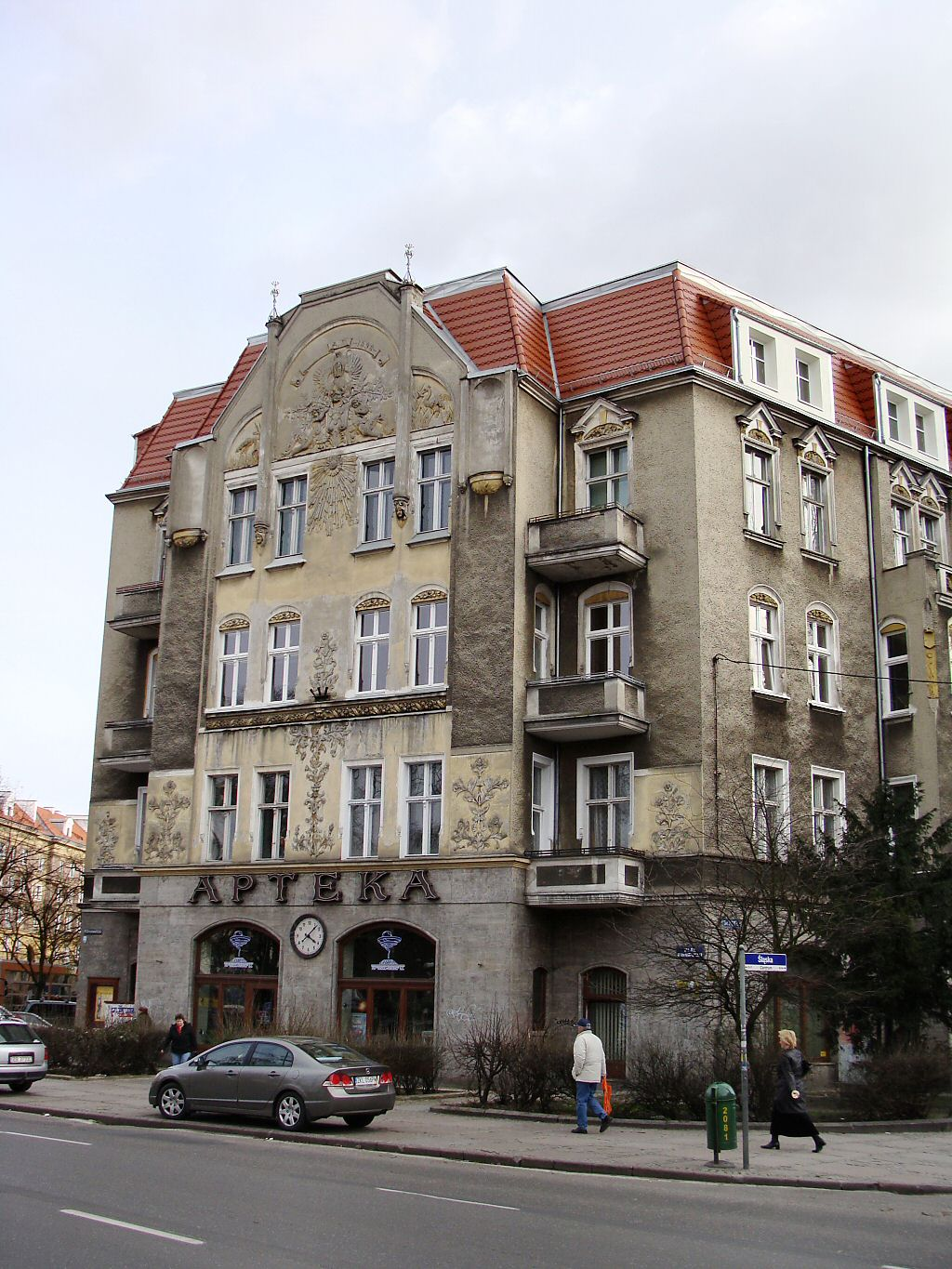
Contemporary pharmacy in an older building

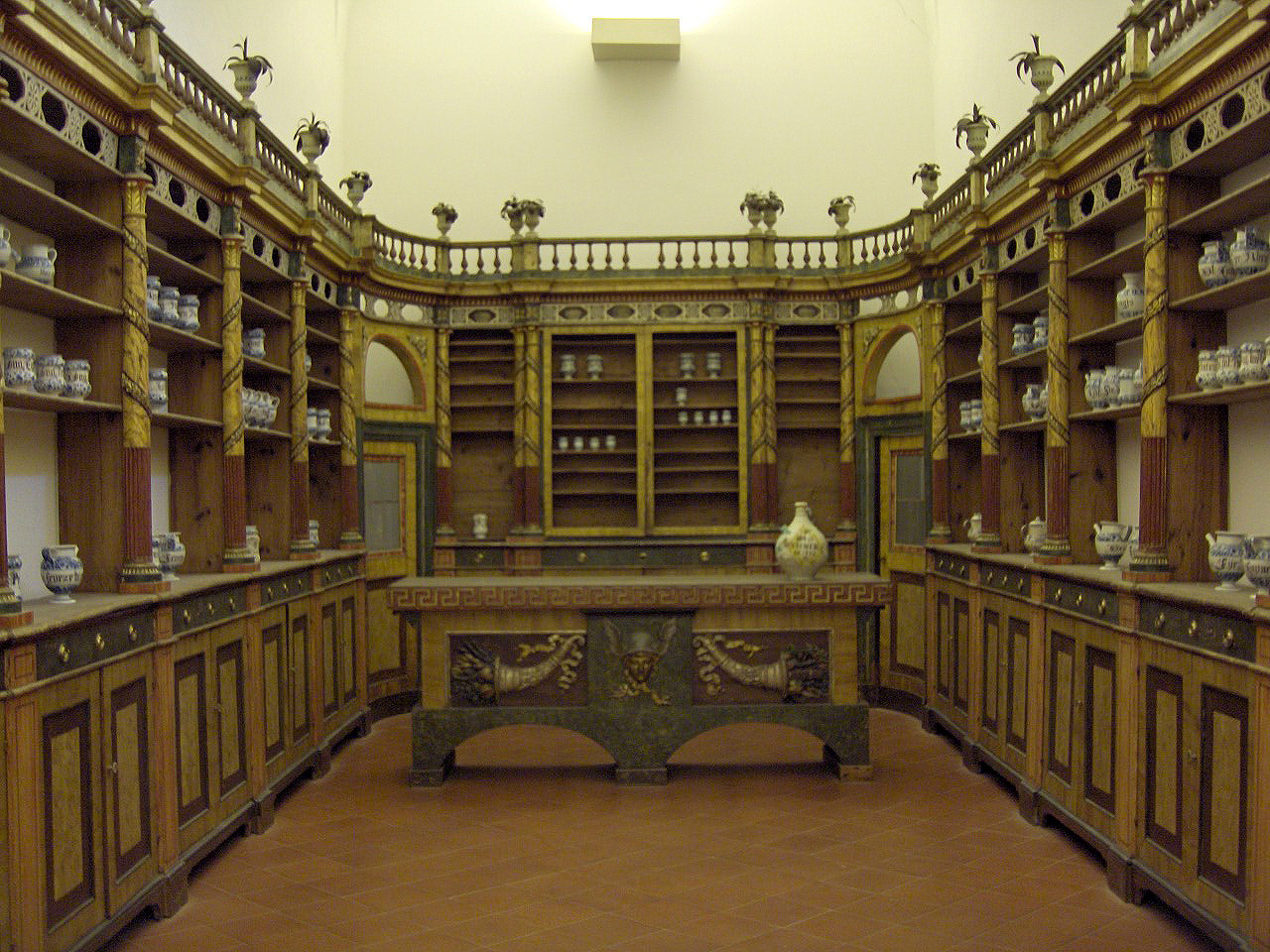
19th-century Italian pharmacy

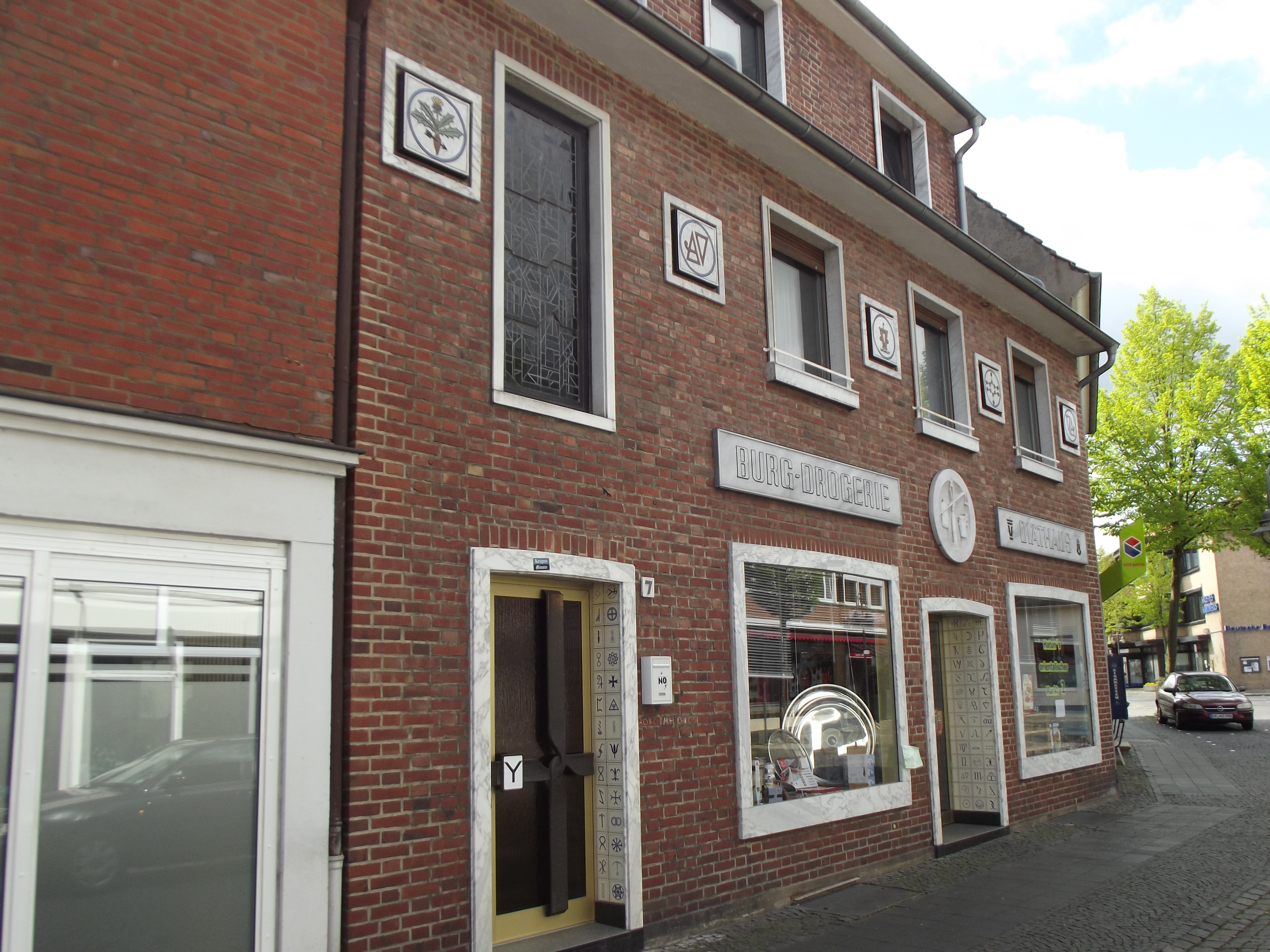
Classic symbols at the wall of a former German pharmacy

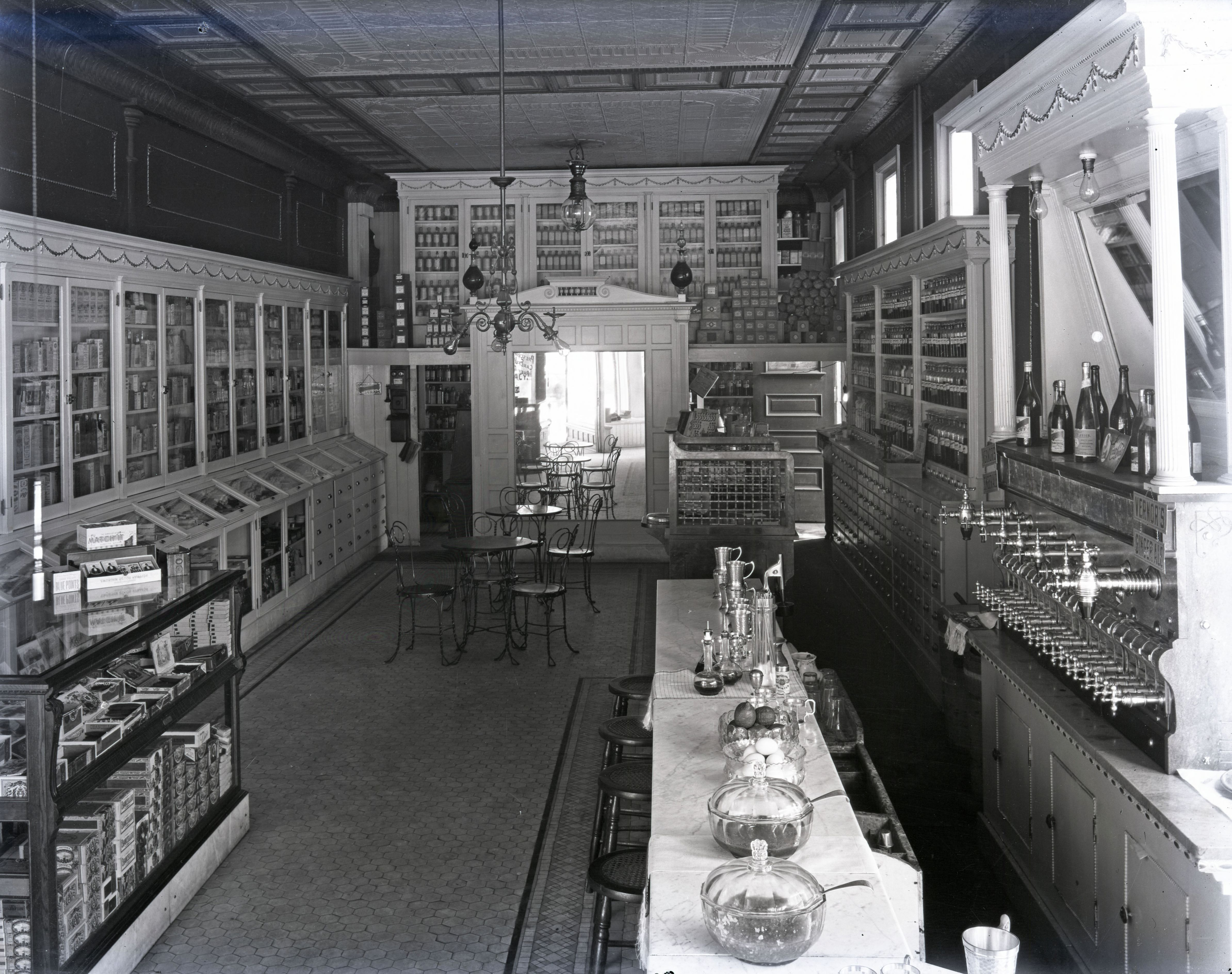
interior of an unidentified drugstore in Toledo, Ohio, United States, 1900s. A large cigar counter and a long bar with seating is featured. The photo was taken by Charles F. Mensing around 1900.

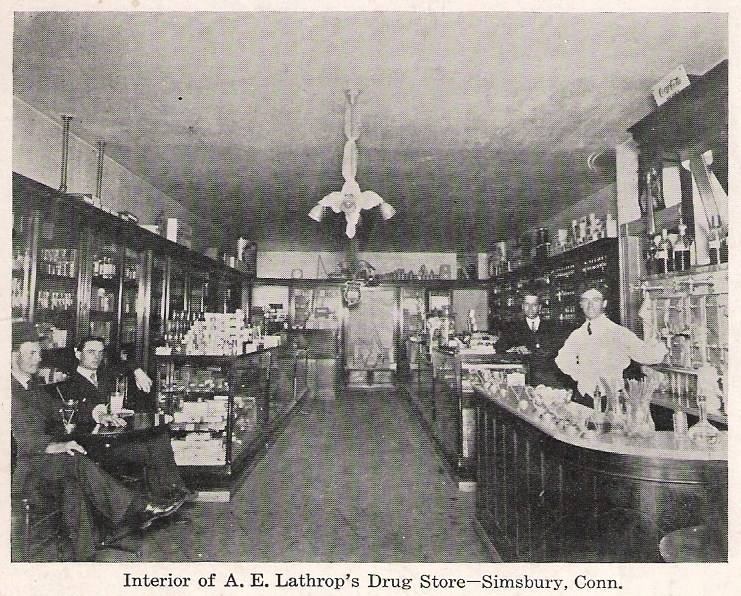
Typical American drug store with a soda fountain, about 1905

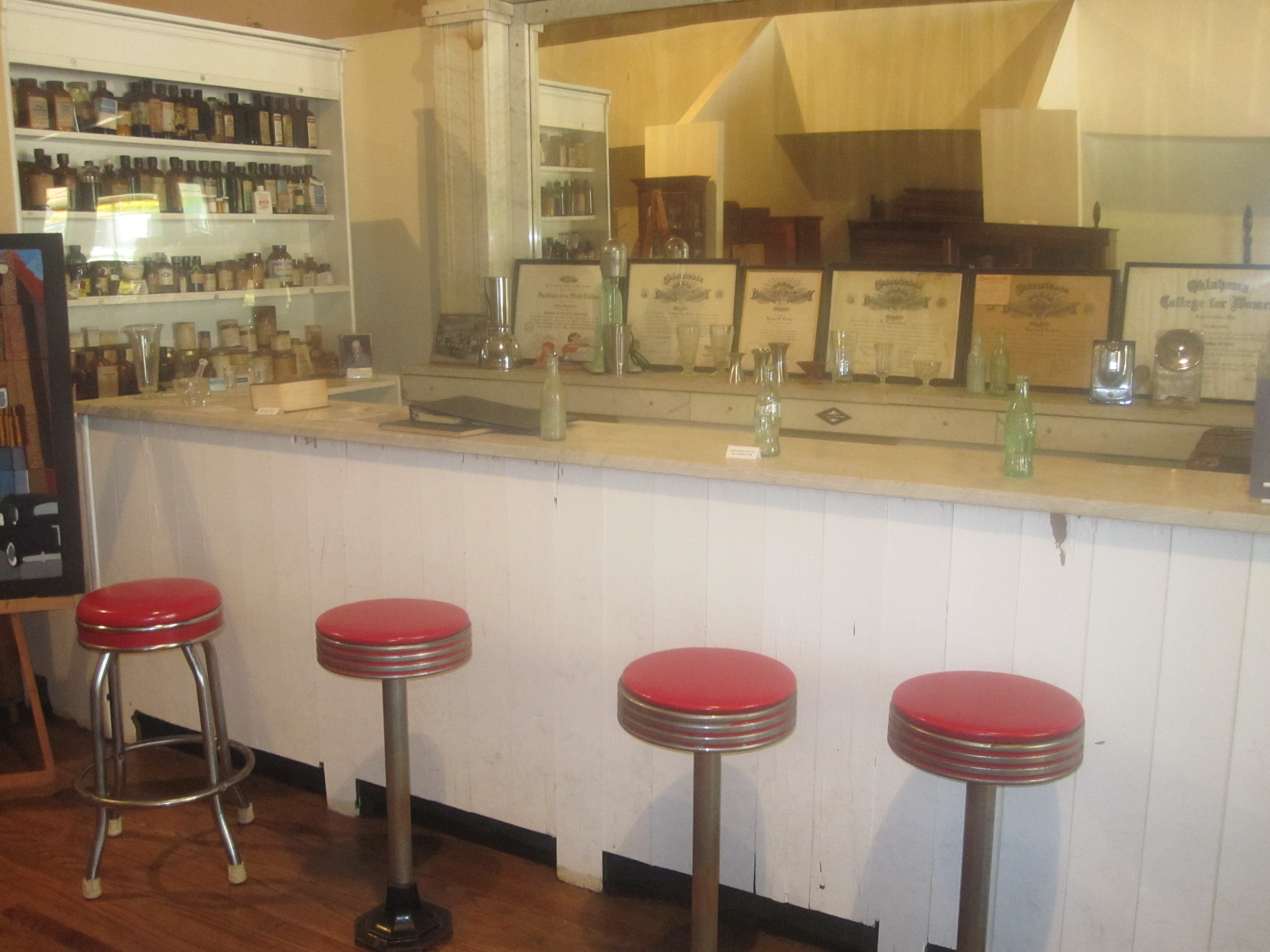
Drug store restoration c. 1920 at Collingsworth County Museum and Art Center

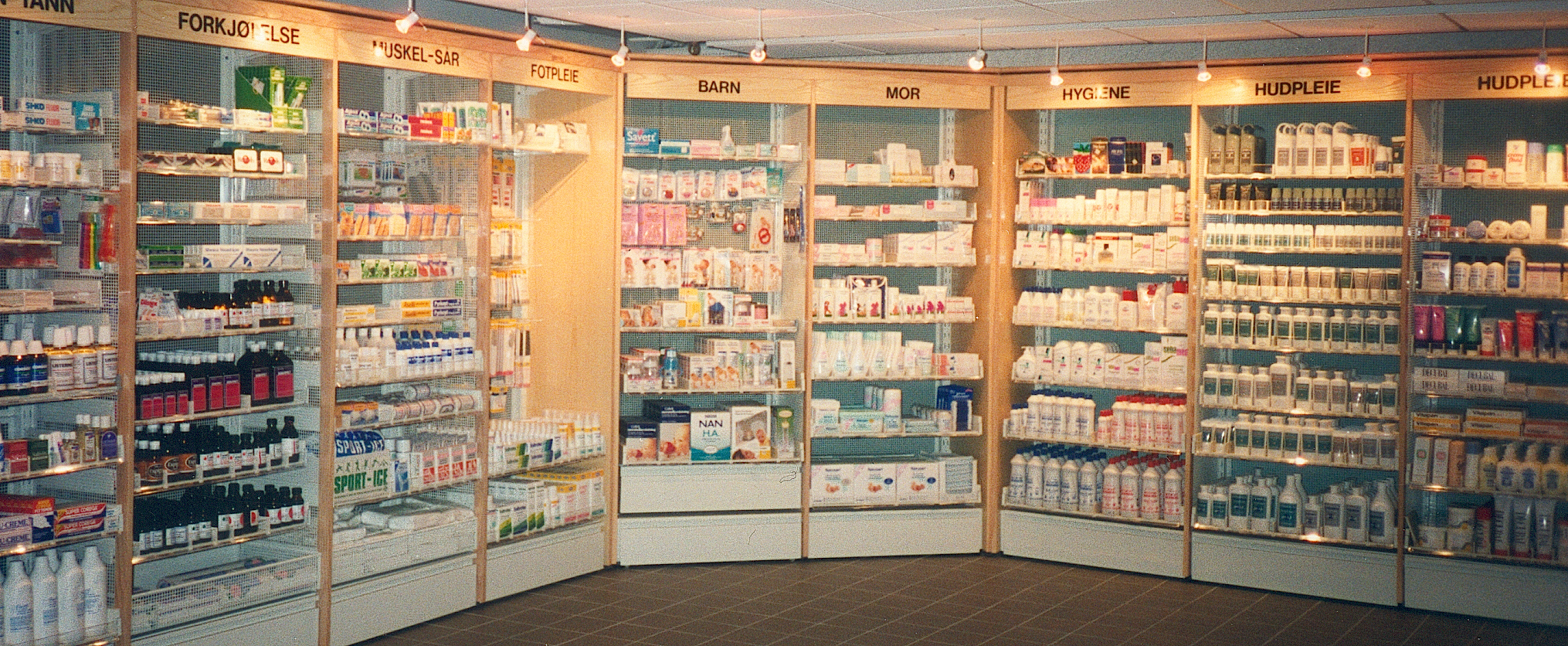
Modern pharmacy in Norway

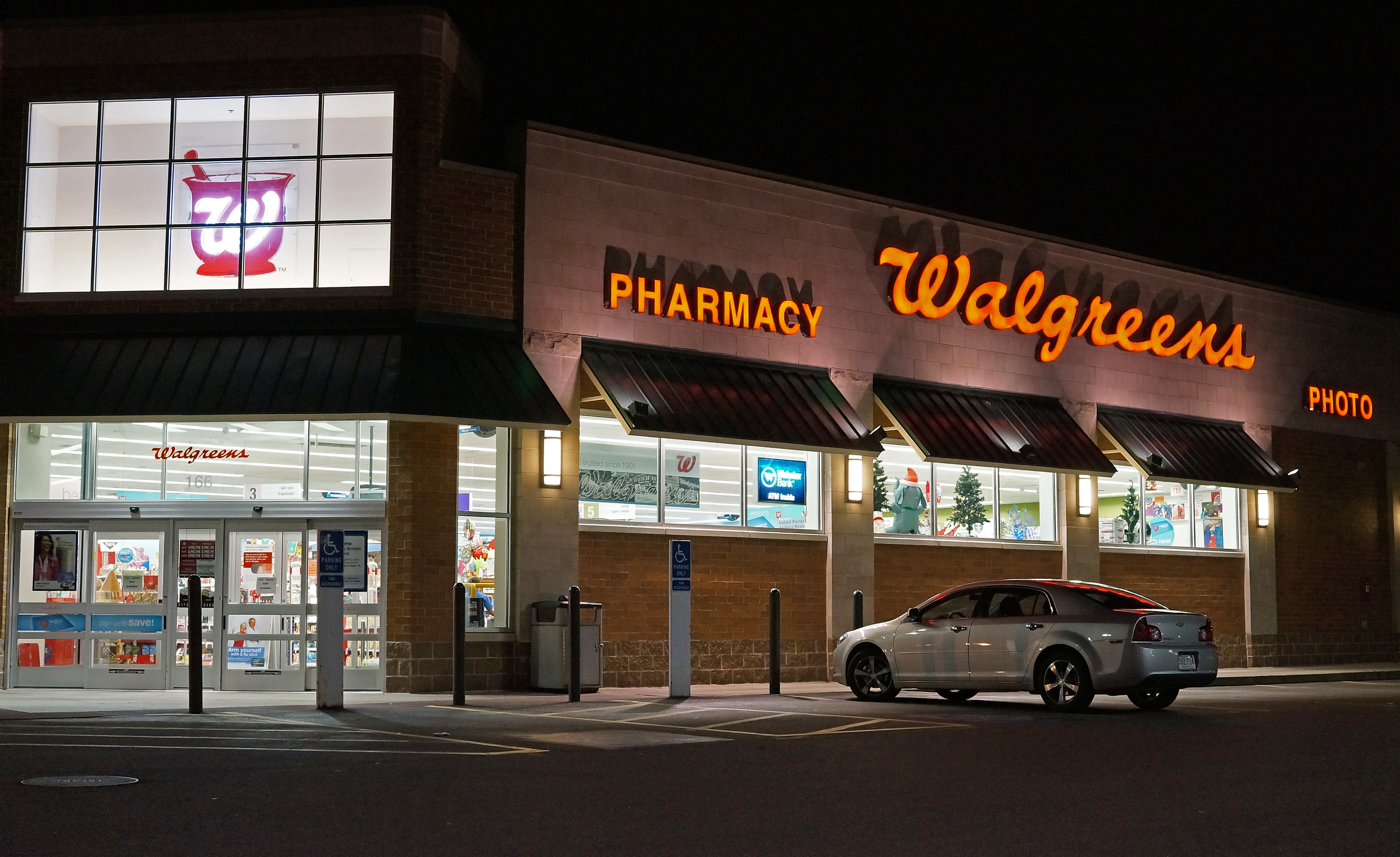
A branch of Walgreens, a pharmacy chain in the United States

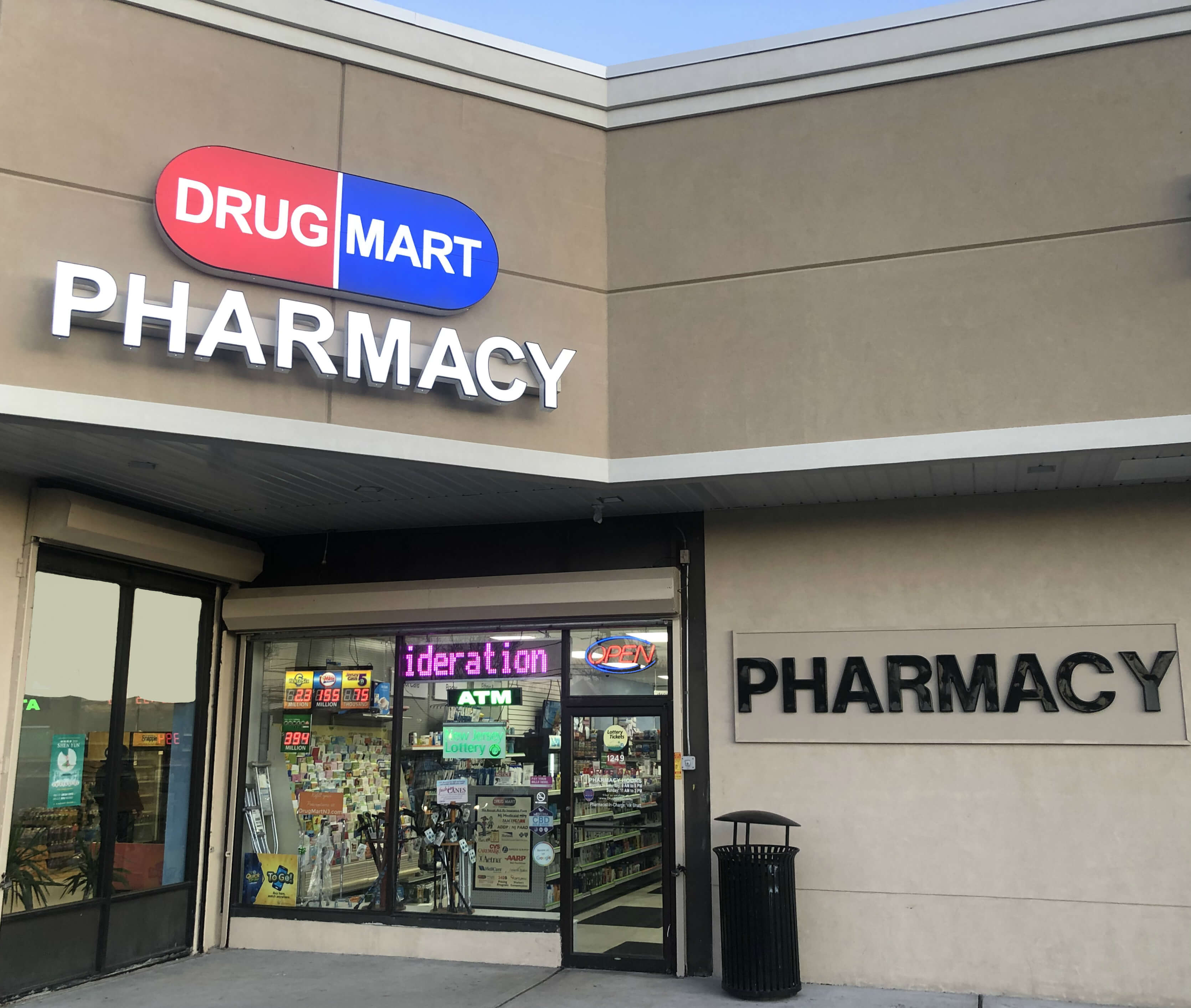
Outside an independent pharmacy in South Plainfield, New Jersey

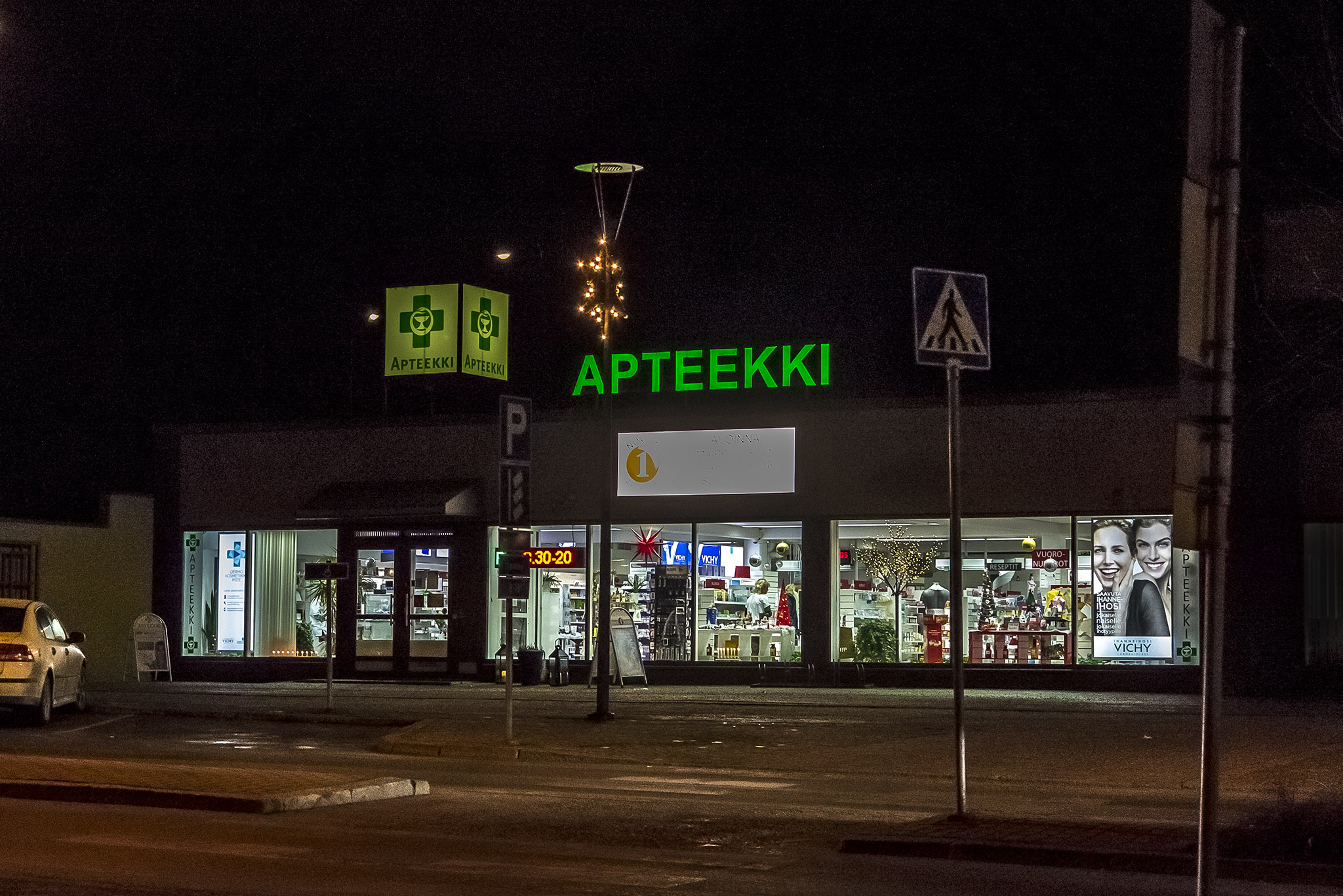
A pharmacy at night in Nokia, Finland

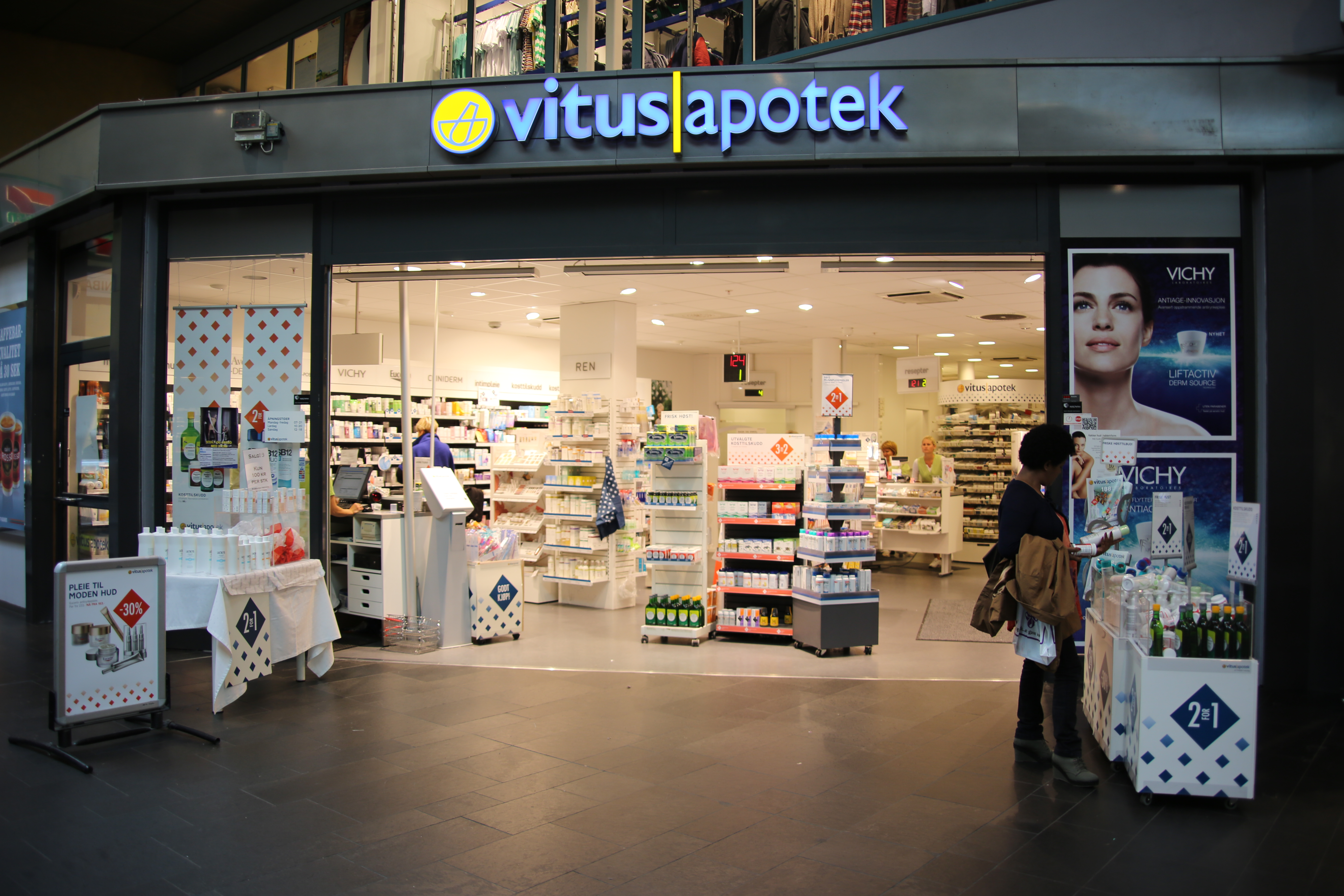
A pharmacy in Norway that is part of a shopping mall

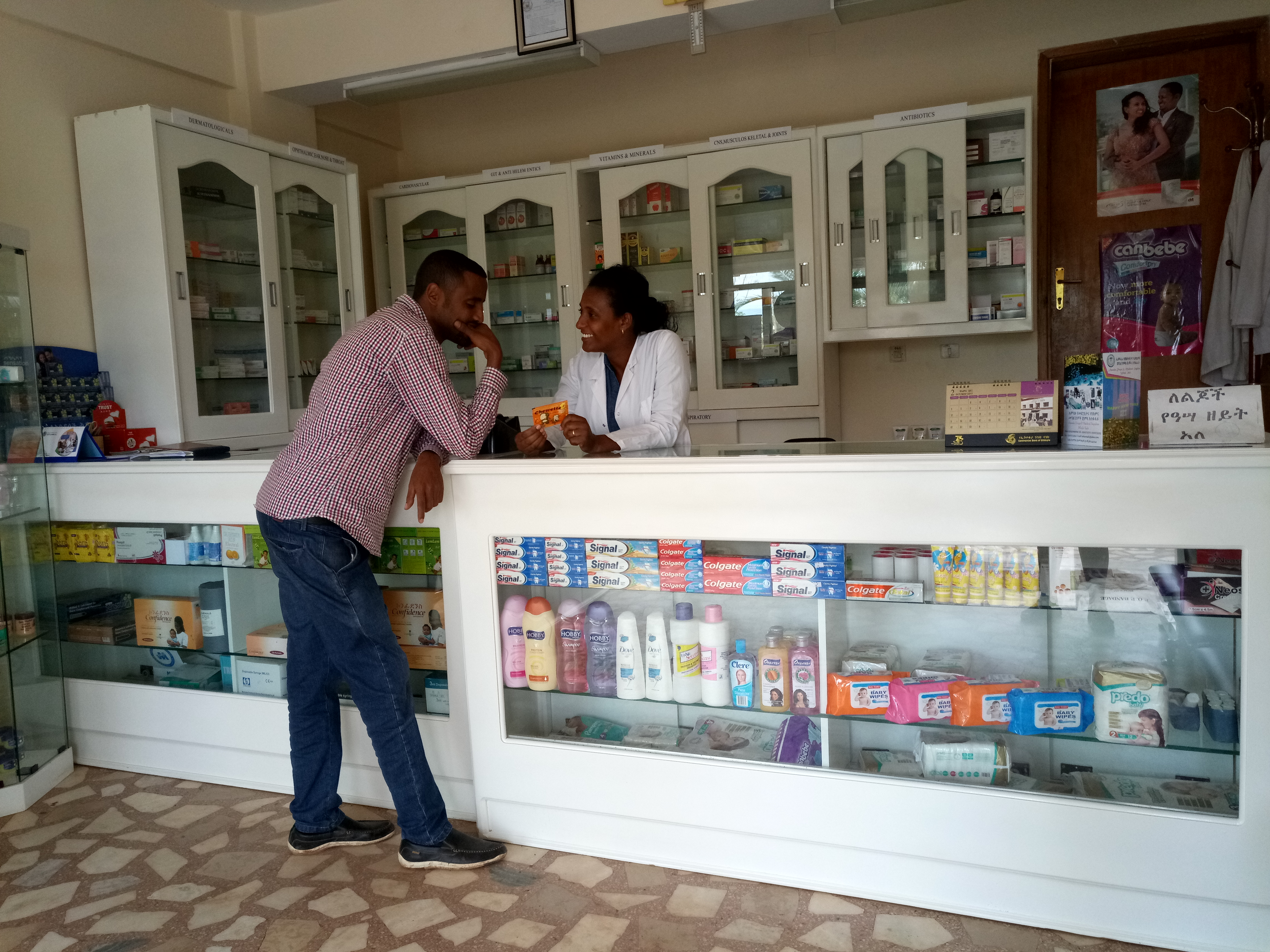
Interior of a pharmacy in Ethiopia

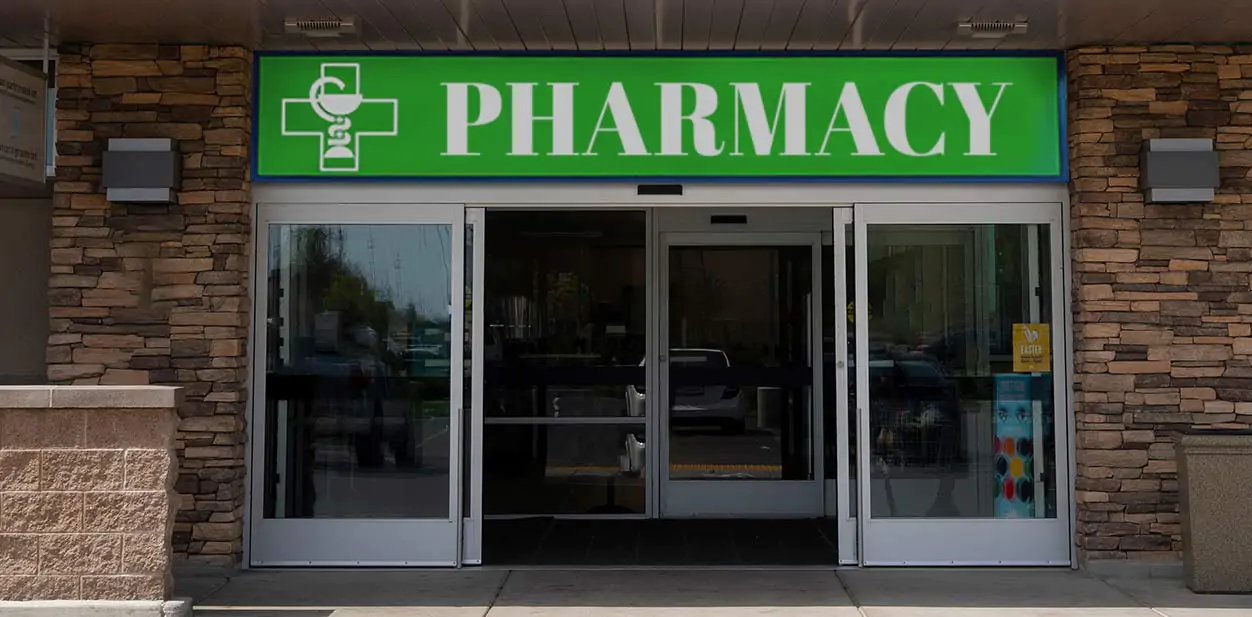
Pharmacy From Outside

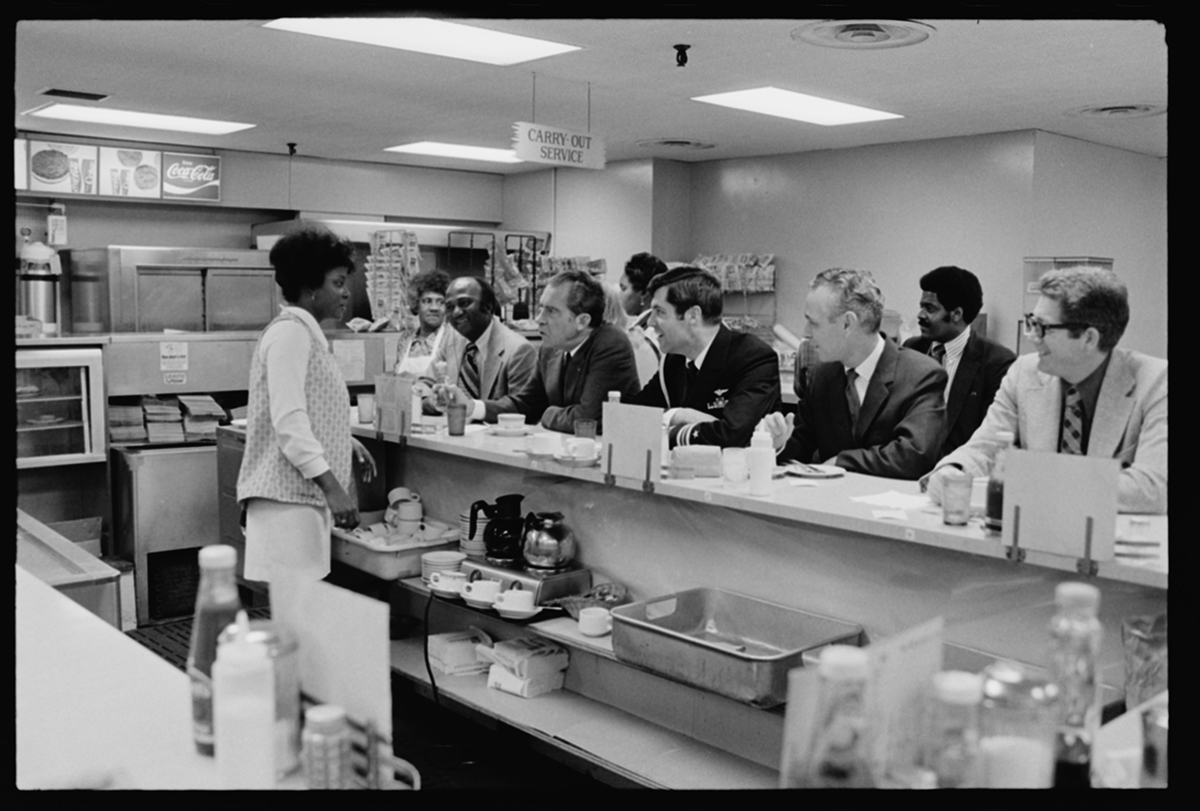
Richard Nixon at a drug store lunch counter in Houston, Texas, on March 20, 1974

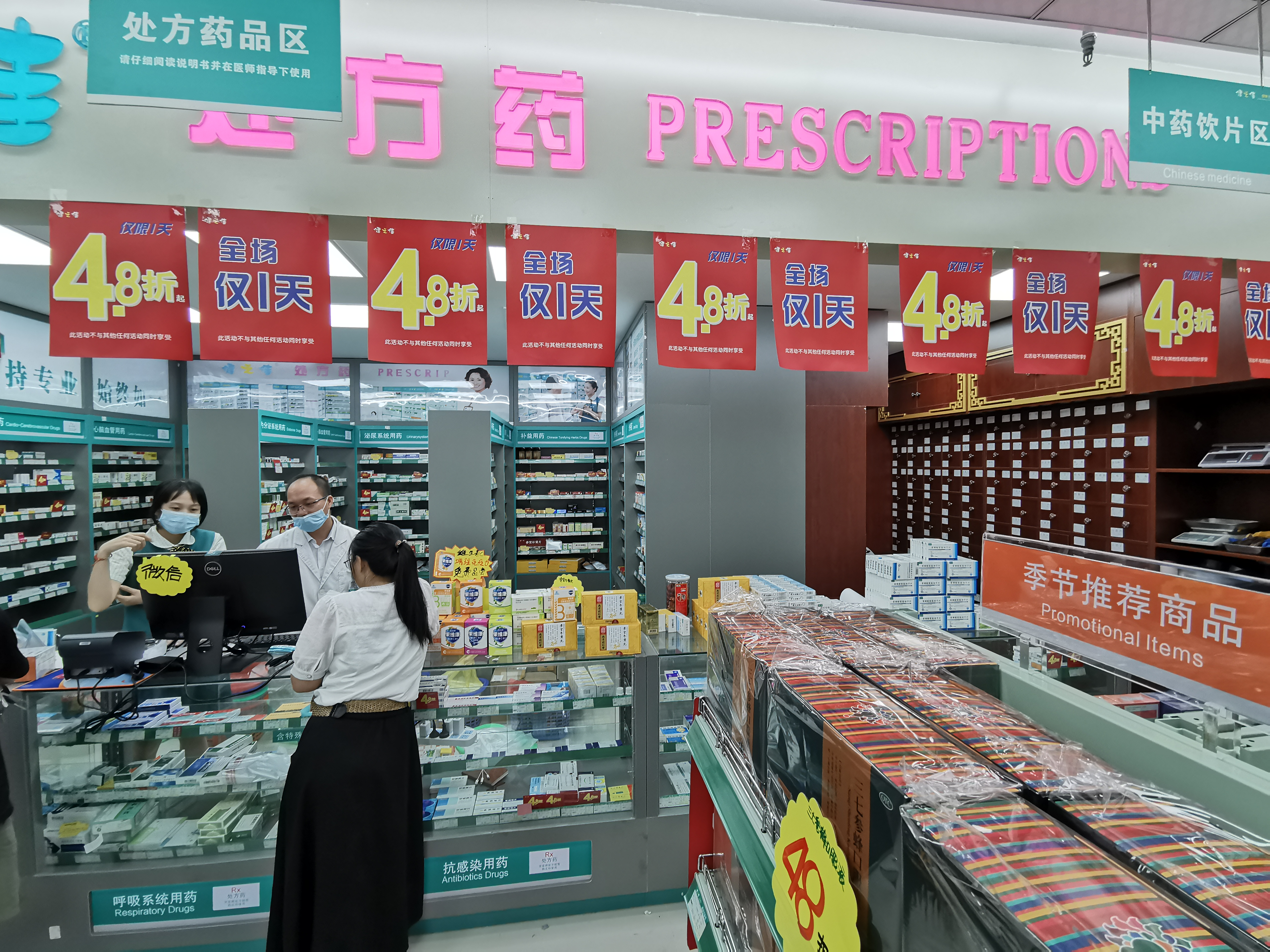
A pharmacy in Nanning, Guangxi, China

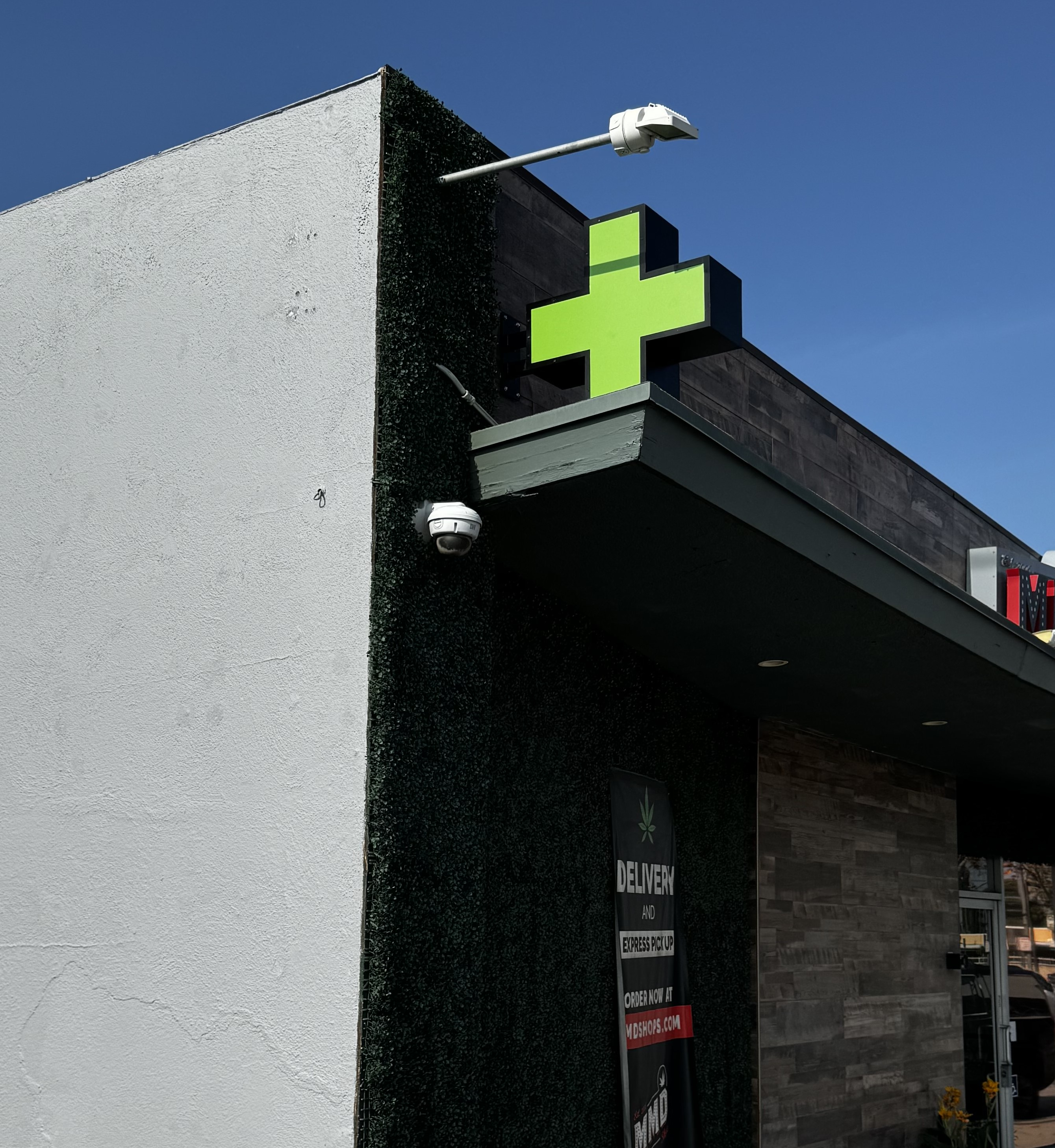
Pharmaceutical store light up sign secured on building front

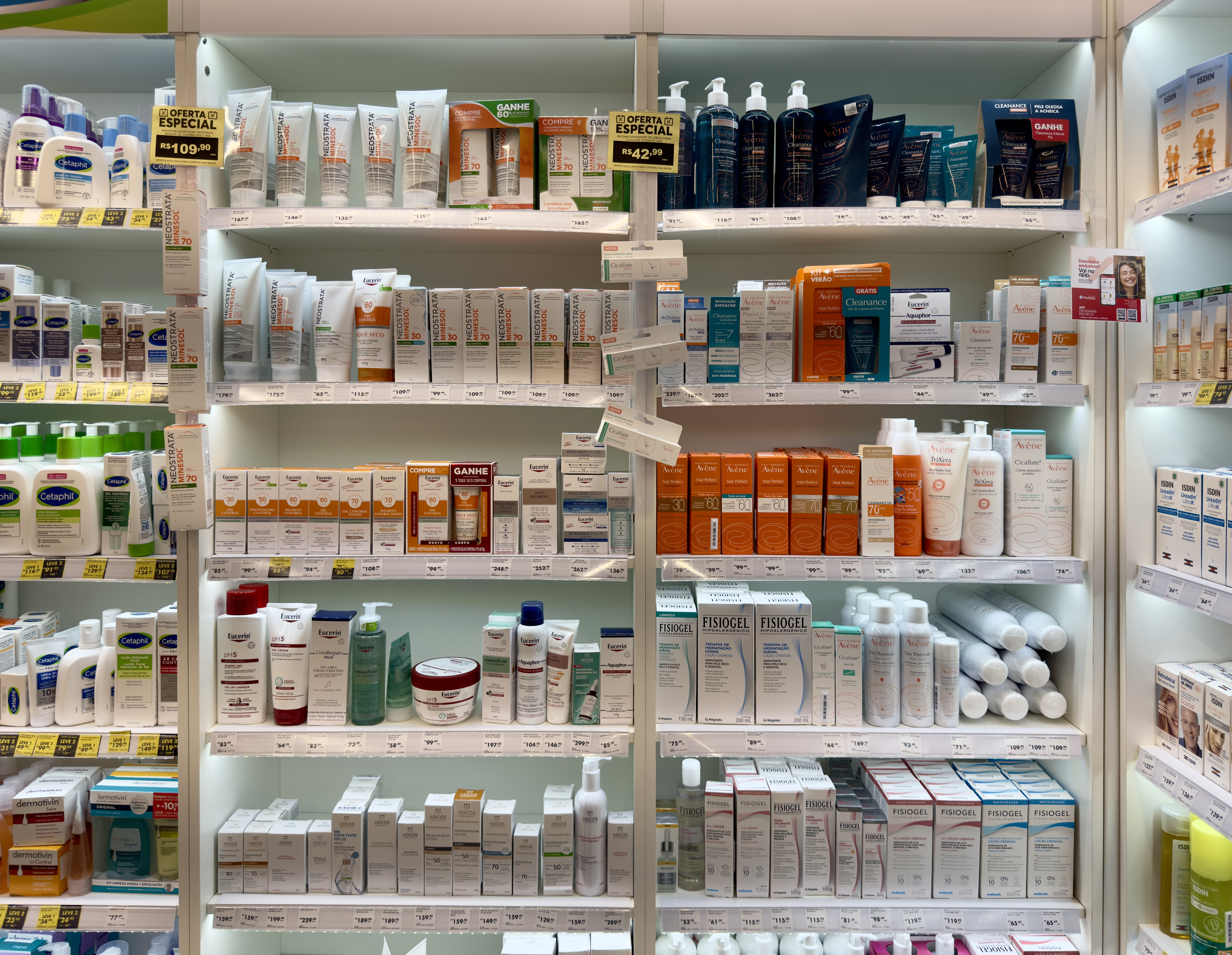
Skin care cosmetics at a pharmacy in Brazil

== See also ==
- Dispensary – Office that dispenses medications
- Apothecary – Former name for a pharmacist
