= Database (journal) =

- Discipline: computational biology, bioinformatics
- Language: English
- Edited by: David Landsman

Publication details
- History: 2009–present
- Publisher: Oxford University Press
- Open access: Yes
- Impact factor: 3.6 (2024)

Standard abbreviations
- ISO 4: Database
- NLM: Database (Oxford)

Indexing
- CODEN: DATAFX
- ISSN: 1758-0463
- OCLC no.: 457251105

Links
- Journal homepage; Online access

Database: The Journal of Biological Databases and Curation is an online peer-reviewed open access scientific journal that publishes research on biological databases and biocuration.

The journal was established in 2009 with David Landsman as editor-in-chief. It is the official journal of the International Society for Biocuration and has published proceedings from the International Biocuration Conference since its inception.

== Abstracting and indexing ==
The journal is abstracted and indexed in MEDLINE/PubMed, the Science Citation Index Expanded, and Chemical Abstracts. According to the Journal Citation Reports, the journal had an impact factor of 3.451 in 2020, and 3.6 in 2024.
