= OpenPHACTS =

Drug discovery organization

Open PHACTS
- Formation: 2011
- Type: Public–private partnership
- Purpose: Semantic interoperability for drug discovery through Open innovation
- Members: 27 member organisations
- Key people: Antony John Williams; Carole Goble; Barend Mons; Gerhard Ecker
- Website: www.openphacts.org; github.com/openphacts

Open PHACTS (Open Pharmacological Concept Triple Store) was a European initiative public–private partnership between academia, publishers, enterprises, pharmaceutical companies and other organisations working to enable better, cheaper and faster drug discovery. It has been funded by the Innovative Medicines Initiative, selected as part of three projects to "design methods for common standards and sharing of data for more efficient drug development and patient treatment in the future".

== Partnerships ==
A total of 27 partners were involved including:

- Academia: Maastricht University, University of Santiago de Compostela, University of Vienna, University of Manchester, University of Bonn, Swiss Institute of Bioinformatics, European Bioinformatics Institute, Vrije Universiteit of Amsterdam, Technical University of Denmark, University of Hamburg
- Pharmaceutical companies: Pfizer, Merck KGaA, Eli Lilly and Company, Novartis, GlaxoSmithKline, AstraZeneca
- Other companies: ChemSpider, Biovia, Eagle Genomics, Entagen
- Publishers: Royal Society of Chemistry, Thomson Reuters

== Drug discovery ==
The Open Pharmacological Space created by the consortium intended to support open innovation and in-house non-public drug discovery research by removing bottlenecks in drug development. Resources from the project are publicly available on GitHub.

To reduce the barriers to drug discovery in industry, academia and for small businesses, the Open PHACTS consortium built the Open PHACTS Discovery Platform. This platform was freely available, integrating pharmacological data from a variety of information resources and providing tools and services to question this integrated data to support pharmacological research.
