= International Society for Biocuration =

International Society for Biocurnation
- Abbreviation: ISB
- Formation: 2008
- Type: Non-profit organization
- Purpose: promotes the field of biocuration
- Website: https://www.biocuration.org/

The International Society for Biocuration (ISB) is a non-profit organisation that promotes the field of biocuration and was founded in early 2009. It provides a forum for information exchange through meetings and workshops. The society's conference, the International Biocuration Conference, has been held in Pacific Grove, California (2005), San José, CA (2007), Berlin (2009), Tokyo, Japan (2010), Washington, DC (2012), Cambridge, UK (2013), Toronto, Canada (2014), Beijing, China (2015), Geneva, Switzerland (2016), Palo Alto, California (2017), Shanghai, China (2018), Cambridge, UK (2019), Padua, Italy (2023), Faridabad, Inda (2024), and Kansas City, USA (2025). The 2020, 2021, and 2022 conferences were held online.

Database is the official journal of the society and it has published the proceedings of the societies conferences since 2009.

== Aims of the society ==
The aims of the society include:

- promoting interactions among biocurators
- fostering the professional development of biocurators
- promoting best practices
- ensuring interoperability
- creating and maintaining standards
- promoting relationships with journal publishers.

== Executive Committee (EC) ==
The Executive Committee (EC) is composed of nine (9) elected members, each with a 3 year term. EC members can serve a maximum of two terms. Within the EC, there are positions for Chair, Secretary and Treasurer that are in charge of leading the EC and by extension the membership. Elections for the EC are held on an annual basis. The EC promotes the ISB's activity to members and non-members, and contributes to the decisions that are taken on behalf of the biocuration community. Additional activities include reviewing microgrant submissions, assisting with organization of the annual Biocuration conference, preparing materials for the ISB election, and maintaining the website.

== Biocuration Career Awards ==
The Biocuration Career Award was an award given between 2016 and 2021 by the International Society for Biocuration for outstanding contributions for the field of biocuration. Since 2022, this award was continued as a Excellence in Biocuration Early Career Award and Excellence in Biocuration Advanced Career Award.

- Excellence in Biocuration Early Career Award
- Excellence in Biocuration Advanced Career Award
- Biannual ISB Exceptional Contribution to Biocuration Award

== See also ==
- Biocuration
- Digital curation
- Metadata
- Ontology

== External references ==
- Official website
