= Microattribution =

Database systems

The term microattribution (a form of data citation) is defined as "giving database accessions the same citation conventions and indices that journal articles currently enjoy". In the sense that the purpose of precise attribution is to extend the scholarly convention of giving citation credit, the provenance of a piece of scholarship (observation or data deposition) is recognized to give credit and priority to a preceding author. Microattribution is thus defined as "a scholarly contribution smaller than a journal article being ascribed to a particular author" or a small scholarly contribution being ascribed to a particular author. Since data accessions can describe contributions that can vastly exceed research articles in size and quality, quantum attribution or precise citation might be better terms.

== Origin ==
The concept was introduced in a February 2007 blog post "Duke of URL" by Myles Axton. "In the interests of giving credit to the resources geneticists find most useful, here are the numbers of papers citing the most frequently cited links."

The term was first used in an April 2007 editorial published in Nature Genetics. "[The Human Variome Project] will need to introduce publishing innovations at both ends of the citation spectrum. It will need to track the citation of each variant's accession code in papers, database entries and across the web. This closing of the online publication loop might be termed microattribution."

Subsequent editorials and blog posts elaborated the idea that the provenance of data accession codes was inseparable from the data and could be used to give credit to the contributors. "Accession numbers to database entries are routinely used for data retrieval. They should now also be used to accrue quantitative credit for their authors in a systematic process of microattribution."

An example of the value of microattributions can be seen in the description of genetic variation. A paper published in Nature Genetics paper in March 2011 concluded that microattribution demonstrably increased the reporting of human variants, leading to a comprehensive online resource for systematically describing human genetic variation. A paper on microattribution and nanopublication as means to incentivize the placement of human genome variation data into the public domain was published in June 2012.

== Nanopublications ==
Barend Mons and Jan Velterop proposed nanopublications for single, attributable and machine-readable assertions in scientific literature. From the technical viewpoint, a nanopublication is a Resource Description Framework (RDF) graph built around an assertion represented as a triple (subject-predicate-object) and usually extracted, manually or automatically, from a scientific publication. The nanopublication enriches the assertion with provenance and publication information. The RDF representation format enables interoperability and thus the re-use of data, whereas provenance and publication information eases authorship recognition, credit distribution, and citation.
