= WikiProfessional =

WikiProfessional (Wiki for Professionals) was an attempt to create a web-based research environment for semantic searching, providing an intuitive tool for analyzing and relating concepts.

When data is entered, the system semantically analyzed and recognized co-occurrences between different entities. The results were visualized through a "Knowlet," which is a visual representation of semantic distance between associated entities. This Knowlet is then used to notify persons that have subscribed to these entities, enabling a rapid data interchange between collaborators.

The major focus was proteins, using a portal named WikiProteins. It contained over a hundred million entries, "melding some of the key biomedical databases into a single information resource". Sources included:

- 245,000 Proteins from UniProt/Swiss-Prot
- 24,000 Gene Ontology terms from the GO Consortium
- 880,000 Concepts from UMLS/NLM
- 112,000,000 Unique sentences from Medline

The project never passed the open beta test phase. It was operated by Knewco and led by initiator Barend Mons, a bioinformatician at the Erasmus MC and Leiden University Medical Centre. Knewco was intending to profit from WikiProfessionals by charging some users (such as drug firms) for "premium services", for example incorporating a private version of the system with in-house data.

After the project disappeared, a group called the Concept Web Alliance formed to try to rebuild a similarly linked database. This became ConceptWiki and the Nanopublication metadata format.
