= Jan Velterop =

Dutch publisher

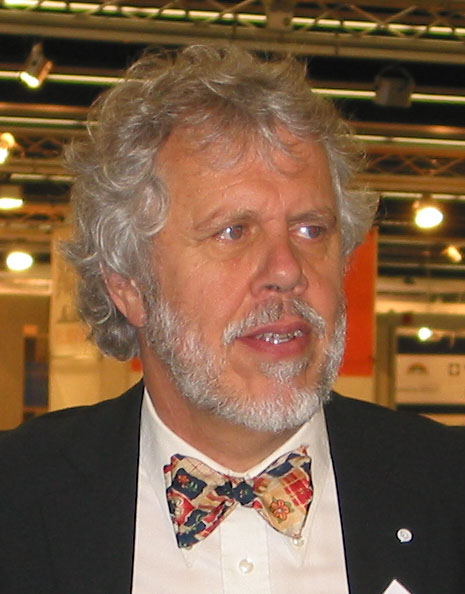
- Born: Johannes Josephus Marinus Velterop; 18 March 1949 (age 76); The Hague, Netherlands
- Known for: Budapest Open Access Initiative; Nanopublication
- Scientific career
- Fields: Academic publishing; Open access
- Institutions: Elsevier; Academic Press; BioMed Central; Nature Publishing Group; Springer Science+Business Media; De Twentsche Courant Tubantia; Knewco Inc.; AQnowledge
- Website: theparachute.blogspot.co.uk

Johannes (Jan) Josephus Marinus Velterop (born 18 March 1949) is a science publisher.

== Education ==
Born in The Hague, Netherlands, he was originally a marine geophysicist and became a science publisher in the mid-1970s.

== Career ==
Velterop started his publishing career at Elsevier in Amsterdam. After a few years out of the scientific field as the director of the Dutch regional newspaper De Twentsche Courant, he returned to international science publishing at Academic Press in London. He next joined Nature as director for a short while, but moved quickly on to help get BioMed Central, the first commercial open access science publisher, off the ground.

Velterop was one of the small group of people who first defined "open access" in 2001 in Budapest, a meeting resulting in the Budapest Open Access Initiative

In 2005 he joined Springer Science+Business Media in the United Kingdom as Director of Open Access.

At the end of March 2008 he left Springer to help further develop semantic approaches to accelerate scientific discovery. Since January 2009 he is involved in the Concept Web Alliance as one of the initiators. He lives in Guildford, UK. He is an active advocate of open access and of the use of microattribution (the hallmark of so-called "nanopublications").

Velterop also serves on the Advisory Boards of several initiatives and companies, such as Knowledge Unlatched and ScienceOpen.
