= AgBase =

Content
- Description: functional genomics resource for agriculture.

Contact
- Research center: University of Arizona
- Authors: Fiona M McCarthy
- Primary citation: McCarthy & al. (2006)
- Release date: 2006

Access
- Website: https://agbase.arizona.edu/

AgBase is a curated genomic database containing functional annotations of agriculturally important animals, plants, microbes and parasites. AgBase biocurators provides annotation of Gene Ontology terms and Plant ontology terms for gene products. By 2011 AgBase provided information for 18 organisms including horse, cat, dog, cotton, rice and soybean.

== See also ==
- Agronomy
- Genomics
