= Canto (gene curation tool) =

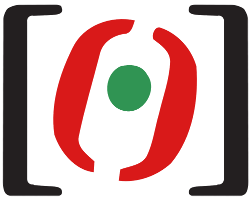

Content
- Description: Canto is a web-based community curation tool for gene-specific data
- Data types captured: Various
- Organisms: Various

Contact
- Research center: University of Cambridge University College London
- Primary citation: PMID 24574118

Access
- Website: curation.pombase.org

Miscellaneous
- Bookmarkable entities: yes

Canto is a web-based tool to support the curation of gene-specific scientific data, by both professional biocurators and publication authors. Canto was developed as part of the PomBase project, and is funded by the Wellcome Trust.

Canto enables experts (biocurators and publication authors) to provide detailed, standardized, sharable annotation from research publications and was originally created for the fission yeast community. Canto is a generic tool that can be readily configured for use with other organisms and other databases and now supports pathogen-host interactions for PHI-base (Rothamsted research) and the curation of phenotypes and genetic interactions at FlyBase (University of Cambridge), and all gene-specific datatypes for the emerging model species Schizosaccharomyces japonicus in JaponicusDB.

== Curation using ontology terms ==
Canto supports the use of bio-ontologies (including the Gene Ontology, Protein Ontology, The Fission Yeast Phenotype Ontology FYPO, and the Sequence Ontology to describe attributes of gene products. Complex ontology structures are hidden by an intuitive search, browse, and drill-down workflow. Canto workflow guides the user through the curation process with prompts for required qualifiers and metadata (for example evidence (provenance), annotation extensions, and experimental conditions). Prompts are tailored to different data types, and their individual specific domains and ranges.

== Community Curation ==
Canto has been successful in supporting community curation, and most of the new curation in PomBase is provided by the community of researchers who use the fission yeast Schizosaccharomyces pombe as a model organism. The PomBase team demonstrate that co-curation by publication authors and professional curators provides higher quality curation to maximise the value and impact of scientific research.
