= Immune Epitope Database and Analysis Resource =

Project hosted by scientists at the La Jolla Institute for Allergy and Immunology

The Immune Epitope Database and Analysis Resource (IEDB) is a project hosted by scientists at the La Jolla Institute for Allergy and Immunology (LIAI), with support from the National Institute of Allergy and Infectious Diseases (NIAID), a part of the National Institutes of Health (NIH), and Department of Health and Human Services (HHS). The focus is dissemination of immune epitope information to facilitate the generation of new research tools, diagnostic techniques, vaccines and therapeutics.

== Database ==
The IEDB contains data related to antibody and T cell epitopes for humans, non-human primates, rodents, and other animal species. Curation of data relating to NIAID Category A, B, and C priority pathogens (including Influenza) and NIAID Emerging and Re-emerging infectious diseases is of highest priority and is being continuously updated. In addition, epitopes from other infectious agents, allergens and autoantigens are being curated.

The database also contains MHC binding data from a variety of different antigenic sources and immune epitope data from the FIMM (Brusic), HLA Ligand (Hildebrand), TopBank (Sette), and MHC binding (Buus) databases. These databases and their investigators are hereby acknowledged as major contributors to the IEDB.

== Tools ==
In addition to the database, the IEDB website hosts an Analysis Resource, which contains a collection of tools to predict and analyze epitopes.
