= PomBase =

Database on Schizosaccharomyces pombe

Content
- Description: The scientific resource for Schizosaccharomyces pombe
- Data types captured: Molecular Function, Biological Process, Cellular Component, Phenotype, Genotype, Allele, Protein Modification, Gene Expression, Protein expression, Nucleotide Sequence, RNA sequence, Protein sequence, Genomics, Human Orthologs, Saccharomyces cerevisiae Orthlogs, Complementation, Disease Associations, Protein features, Physical Interactions, Genetic Interactions
- Organisms: Schizosaccharomyces pombe

Contact
- Research center: University of Cambridge and University College London
- Authors: Antonia Lock, Midori A Harris, Manuel Lera-Ramírez, Pascal Carme, Kim Rutherford, Juan Mata, Jürg Bähler, Steve Oliver, Valerie Wood
- Primary citation: Carme, et al (2026)
- Release date: 2011

Access
- Website: pombase.org
- Download URL: Downloads

Miscellaneous
- License: Creative Commons Attribution 4.0 International license, GNU General Public License, MIT License
- Curation policy: Professionally and community curated
- Bookmarkable entities: Yes

PomBase is a model organism database that provides online access to the fission yeast Schizosaccharomyces pombe genome sequence and annotated features, together with a wide range of manually curated functional gene-specific data. The PomBase website was redeveloped in 2016 to provide users with a more fully integrated, better-performing service (described in).

== Data Curation and Quality Control ==
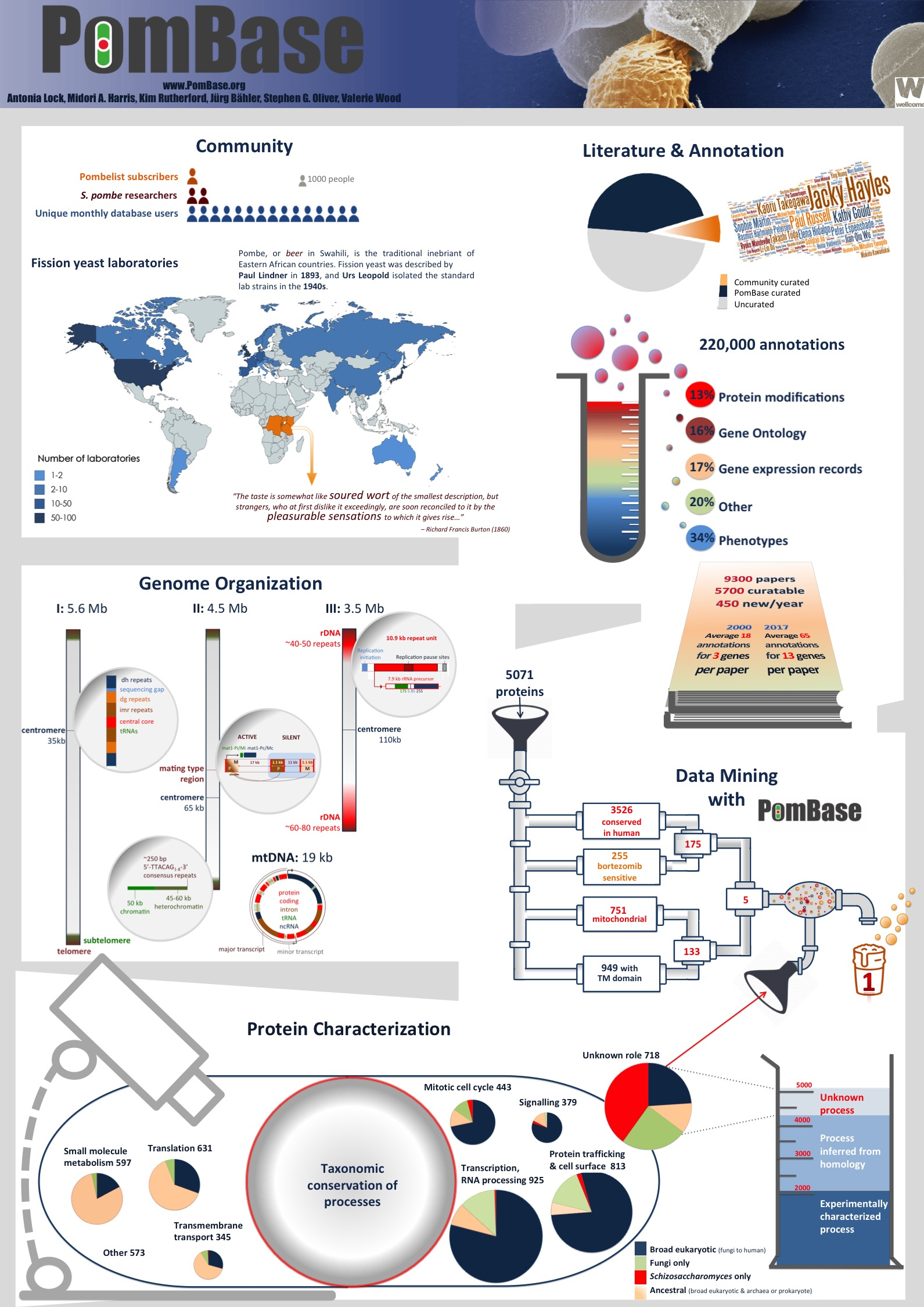
An overview of data provided by PomBase and ways to access it.

PomBase staff manually curate a wide variety of data types using both primary literature and bioinformatics sources, and numerous mechanisms are employed to ensure both syntactical and biological content validity.

Types of data curated include:

- Genome sequence and features (e.g. physical location of genes in the genome)
- Protein and ncRNA functions, the cellular processes they participate in and where they localize
- Phenotypes associated with different alleles and genotypes
- Specific protein modification sites and when they occur
- Human and budding yeast orthologs of S. pombe genes (manually curated dataset)
- Metadata of datasets loaded into the genome browser
- Disease associations for when the human ortholog is known to cause disease
- Data regarding when specific genes are expressed
- Complementation data for where there is functional complementation between a fission yeast gene and a gene from another organism
- Subunit composition of complexes

== Data Organization ==
Gene annotation can be viewed either at a gene-specific level (on the gene pages) or at a term-specific level (on the ontology term pages). This makes it possible to either:

- View all annotations created for a gene, for example pat1
- View all genes annotated a term, for example cytokinesis
- View all annotations created from a specific reference, for example 26776736 Chica et al. 2016

Genome-wide datasets (including protein datasets, all annotations, manually curated ortholog lists etc) can be accessed from the datasets page. Datasets suitable for display in a genome browser and that have been loaded can be accessed via the PomBase JBrowse instance.

PomBase uses several biological ontologies to capture gene-specific information, including:

- Gene Ontology (GO) - used to describe the enzymatic functions, biological roles and cellular locations of gene products
- Fission Yeast Phenotype Ontology (FYPO), Used to associate phenotypes with alleles of genes, in comparison to the phenotype of the reference strain
- Sequence Ontology - used to describe DNA or protein features
- Protein modifications - using PSI-MOD

== Gene Characterization Status ==
The GO slim page provides an overview of the "biological role" of all "known" fission yeast genes - these are proteins that have either been experimentally characterized in fission yeast, or in another species and transferred by orthology.

Remarkably, nearly 20% of eukaryotic proteomes, from yeast to human, are uncharacterized in terms of the pathways and processes that these proteins participate in, making it one of the great unsolved problems in biology. The role that these proteins play in biology, have not yet been discovered in any species. To aid research into these unknown proteins, PomBase maintains an inventory of uncharacterized fission yeast proteins. The priority unstudied genes list represents the subset of uncharacterized fission yeast genes that are conserved to man, making it an especially high priority research target.

== Community co-Curation ==
To supplement the work of the small team of professional PomBase curators, fission yeast researchers contribute annotations directly to PomBase via an innovative community curation scheme, for which an online curation tool, Canto, has been developed. Community curation is reviewed by PomBase staff, and this results in highly accurate, effectively co-curated, annotations.

PomBase maintains an annotation stats page.

== Knowledgebase Updates ==
- News updates on the PomBase homepage
- Posts to the research community mailing list
- NAR (Nucleic Acids Research) database updates
- Bluesky
- Facebook group
- Linkedin group

== Documentation ==
Pombase provides both documentation and an FAQ.

Usage of PomBase as a research tool is explored in the "Eukaryotic Genomic Databases" (Methods and Protocols) book chapter. Developments and updates are described in the NAR Database Issue papers. For a detailed overview of using S. pombe as a model organism see the genetics primer
