= Pharmacy management system =

System to store and organize medication use process

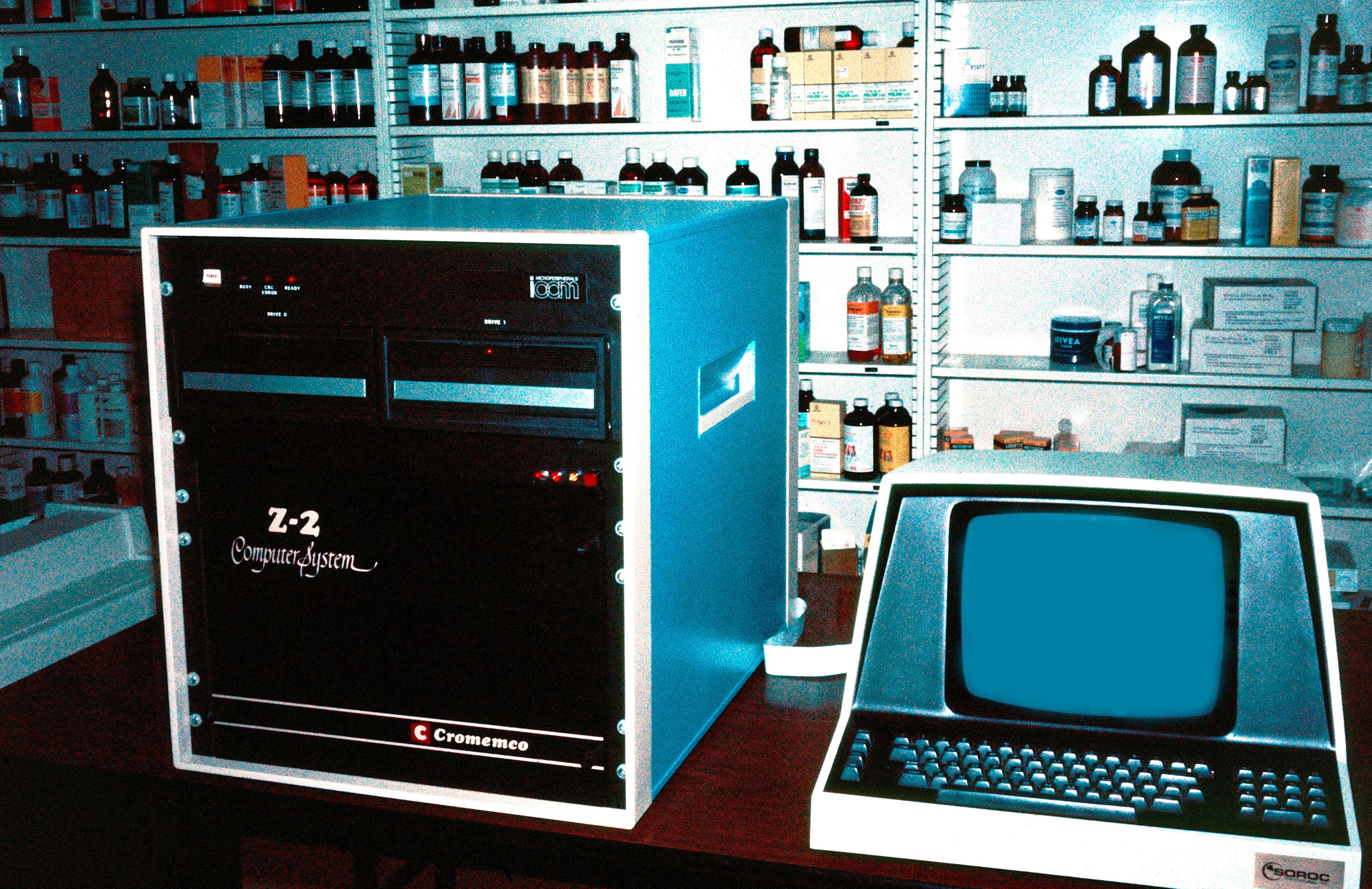
An early pharmacy management system from 1977

The pharmacy management system, also known as the pharmacy information system, is a system that stores data and enables functionality that organizes and maintains the medication use process within pharmacies.

These systems may be an independent technology for the pharmacy's use only, or in a hospital setting, pharmacies may be integrated within an inpatient hospital computer physician order entry (CPOE) system.

Necessary actions for a basic, functioning pharmacy management system include a user interface, data entry and retention, and security limits to protect patient health information. Pharmacy computer software is usually purchased ready-made or provided by a drug wholesaler as part of their service. Various pharmacy software operating systems are common place throughout the many practice settings.

== Purpose ==
The pharmacy management system serves many purposes, including the safe and effective dispensing of pharmaceutical drugs. During the dispensing process, the system will prompt the pharmacist to verify the medication they have is for the correct patient and has the correct quantity, dosage, and information on the prescription label. Advanced pharmacy management systems offer clinical decision support and may be configured to alert the pharmacist to perform clinical interventions, such as an opportunity to offer verbal counseling if the patient's prescription requires additional education in the pharmacy.

Pharmacy management systems should also serve the pharmacist throughout the Pharmacists’ Patient Care Process, a cycle developed by the Joint Commission of Pharmacy Practitioners (JCPP). The process details the steps pharmacists take to practice tangible, proven care to their patients.

== Pharmacist patient care process ==
The JCPP's pharmacist patient care process consists of five steps: collect, assess, plan, implement, and follow-up. Ideally, the pharmacy management system assists with each of these practices. The pharmacy system should Collect data at intake and continue to store and organize information as the pharmacist learns more about the patient's medications, their history, goals, and other factors that may affect their health. The technology within the pharmacy information system should allow the pharmacists to Assess the collected information to form a Plan and Implement creative strategies that address the patient's issues. After implementing a plan, the pharmacist should routinely Follow-Up with the patient and make adjustments as needed to further progress.

== Vendors ==
=== Outpatient software vendors ===
Outpatient pharmacies typically are retail pharmacies that offer patient care services outside of hospitals and treatment facilities. Outpatient pharmacies, also known as community pharmacies or independent pharmacies, offer care in the form of medication therapy management (MTM), patient education, and clinical services.

==== Rx30 ====
Developed in Florida in 1980, Rx30 is a multi-platform software that offers automated pharmacy processes, vendor integrations, and compounding functionality. The Core Services include Accounts Receivable, Point of Sale, and Virtual Pharmacist, a feature that automates the refill process. On October 6, 2016, Rx30 announced its merger with Computer-Rx.

=== Inpatient software vendors ===
Inpatient pharmacies operate within hospitals and dispense medications to admitted patients receiving treatment. Inpatient pharmacists manage patient health alongside doctors and nurses, and the pharmacy management system must integrate with the various systems operating throughout the hospital to maintain accurate Electronic Medical or Health Records (EMR, EHR).

==== Epic Willow ====
Epic, named for the long-form poems chronicling hero's lives, began in 1979 by founder Judith R. Faulkner. Epic software currently manages over 200 million patient electronic records. The Willow Inpatient Pharmacy System, when combined with other Epic systems, allows pharmacies access to medical administration records (MAR) and links all aspects of the ordering and dispensing process to simplify collaboration amongst all parties involved in patient care management.

==== Cerner PharmNet: Medication Manager ====
Cerner Corporation has provided health information technology (HIT) to hospitals and healthcare systems since 1979. Cerner PharmNet enables pharmacists to automate their workflow processes and center care around the patient, not the encounter. This software allows pharmacists and doctors to manage prescriptions and verification from the same order in order to streamline medication management.

=== Datascan Pharmacy Software ===
Datascan was started back in 1981 by Alex Minassian focused on providing pharmacy management software to independently owned community pharmacies. Initially, Datascan modified the code it had purchased and began selling its DOS based version of the software. In the early 2000's Winpharm was written and released as an updated Windows version of the software, which continued the ability to quickly fill prescriptions using only the keyboard as part of the fill screen. Back in 2009, Kevin Minassian stepped in to purchase Datascan. Today, over 40 years later, Datascan continues to serve the needs of independent pharmacies nationwide with a focus on technology and support.

== See also ==
- Health information technology
- Pharmacoinformatics
