= Pharmacoinformatics =

Drug discovery and development requires the integration of multiple scientific and technological disciplines. These include chemistry, biology, pharmacology, pharmaceutical technology and extensive use of information technology. The latter is increasingly recognised as Pharmacoinformatics. Pharmacoinformatics relates to the broader field of bioinformatics.

== Introduction ==
The main idea behind the field is to integrate different informatics branches (e.g. bioinformatics, chemoinformatics, immunoinformatics, etc.) into a single platform, resulting in a seamless process of drug discovery. The first reference of the term "Pharmacoinformatics" can be found in the year of 1993.

The first dedicated department for Pharmacoinformatics was established at the National Institute Of Pharmaceutical Education And Research, S.A.S. Nagar, India in 2003. This has been followed by different universities worldwide including a program by European universities named the European Pharmacoinformatics Initiative (Europin).

== Definition ==
Pharmacoinformatics is also referred to as pharmacy informatics. According to the article "Pharmacy Informatics: What You Need to Know Now" by the University of Illinois at Chicago Pharmacoinformatics may be defined as: “the scientific field that focuses on medication-related data and knowledge within the continuum of healthcare systems.” It is the application of computers to the storage, retrieval and analysis of drug and prescription information. Pharmacy informaticists work with pharmacy information management systems that help the pharmacist safe decisions about patient drug therapies with respect to, medical insurance records, drug interactions, as well as prescription and patient information.

Pharmacy informatics can be thought of as a sub-domain of the larger professional discipline of health informatics. Health informatics is the study of interactions between people, their work processes and engineered systems within health care with a focus on pharmaceutical care and improved patient safety. For example, the Health Information Management Systems Society (HIMSS) defines pharmacy informatics as, "the scientific field that focuses on medication-related data and knowledge within the continuum of healthcare systems - including its acquisition, storage, analysis, use and dissemination - in the delivery of optimal medication-related patient care and health outcomes"

== See also ==
- Software programs for pharmacy workflow management
