= Barend Mons =

Biologist and bioinformatics specialist

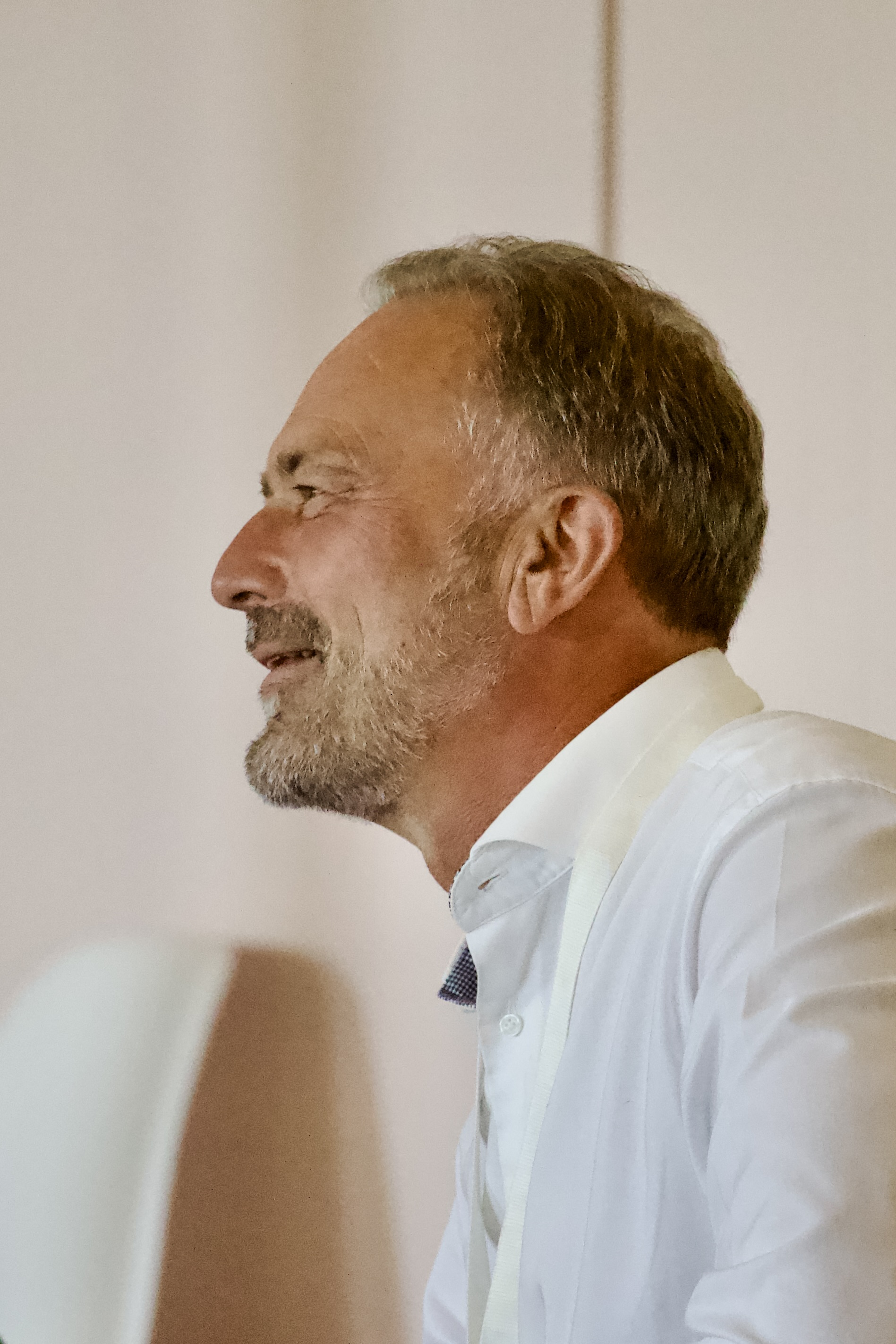
- Born: 1957 (age 68–69); The Hague, Netherlands
- Known for: FAIR Data; Nanopublications; Open PHACTS
- Awards: Order of the Netherlands Lion (2024) Eijkman Medal for Tropical Medicine Research (1988) Fellow of the International Science Council (2024)
- Scientific career
- Institutions: Leiden University Medical Center; Leiden Academic Centre for Drug Research; CODATA
- Thesis: Intra erythrocytic differentiation of Plasmodium Berghei (1986)
- Website: www.go-fair.org; www.gofairfoundation.org; www.gofairfoundation.org/lifes

Barend Mons (born 1957, The Hague) is a molecular biologist and a FAIR data specialist. The first decade of his scientific career he spent on fundamental research on malaria parasites and later on translational research for malaria vaccines. In the year 2000 he switched to advanced data stewardship and (biological) systems analytics. He is most known for innovations in scholarly collaboration, especially nanopublications, and knowledge graph based discovery.

In 2012 Barend was appointed full Professor in biosemantics in the Department of Human Genetics at the Leiden University Medical Center (LUMC) in The Netherlands. In 2014 he organised the seminal FAIR conference at the Lorentz centre that led to the FAIR data initiative and GO FAIR. In 2015 he was appointed chair of the High Level Expert Group on the European Open Science Cloud.

From 2018 to 2023 Barend was the elected president of CODATA, the affiliated organisation on research data related issues of the International Science Council. He has also been the European representative in the Board on Research Data and Information (BRDI) of the National Academies of Sciences, Engineering, and Medicine in the USA. In 2023 he was also appointed professor at the Leiden Academic Centre for Drug Research.

In 2024, he was appointed as Fellow of the International Science Council. At his retirement in 2024 he was Knighted by the Dutch King in the ‘Order of the Netherlands Lion’, the oldest and highest reward for cultural and scientific contributions to the international society.

Barend is a frequent keynote speaker about FAIR and open science around the world, and continues to participate in various national and international boards.

== Education ==
Mons was awarded a Masters (1981 Cum Laude) and a PhD (1986) from Leiden University on cellular and molecular biology of the malaria parasite Plasmodium berghei, and has worked for more than ten years on the genetic differentiation of malaria parasites and vaccine research, publishing over 45 research articles.

Barend was one of the designers and coordinators of the transformational Innovative Medicines Initiative (IMI) project known as Open PHACTS, pioneering the use of semantic technologies, nanopublications and micro-attributions in pharmaceutical biomedical research. From 2013 to 2015 he acted as Head of Node of the Dutch Node in ELIXIR. In 2014, he initiated the FAIR Data initiative and in 2015 he was appointed Chair of the High Level Expert Group for the European Open Science Cloud.
