= Generic Model Organism Database =

Generic Model Organism Database (GMOD)
- Operating system: Windows, Mac OS X
- Type: Bioinformatics
- License: GPL v3
- Website: gmod.org/wiki/Main_Page

The Generic Model Organism Database (GMOD) project provides biological research communities with a toolkit of open-source software components for visualizing, annotating, managing, and storing biological data. The GMOD project is funded by the United States National Institutes of Health, National Science Foundation and the USDA Agricultural Research Service.

== History ==
The GMOD project was started in the early 2000s as a collaboration between several model organism databases (MODs) who shared a need to create similar software tools for processing data from sequencing projects. MODs, or organism-specific databases, describe genome and other information about important experimental organisms in the life sciences and capture the large volumes of data and information being generated by modern biology. Rather than each group designing their own software, four major MODs--FlyBase, Saccharomyces Genome Database, Mouse Genome Database, and at or run off a Chado schema database.

== Chado database schema ==
The Chado schema aims to cover many of the classes of data frequently used by modern biologists, from genetic data to phylogenetic trees to publications to organisms to microarray data to IDs to RNA/protein expression. Chado makes extensive use of controlled vocabularies to type all entities in the database; for example: genes, transcripts, exons, transposable elements, etc., are stored in a feature table, with the type provided by Sequence Ontology. When a new type is added to the Sequence Ontology, the feature table requires no modification, only an update of the data in the database. The same is largely true of analysis data that can be stored in Chado as well.

The existing core modules of Chado are:

- sequence - for sequences/features
- cv - for controlled-vocabs/ontologies
- general - currently just dbxrefs
- organism - taxonomic data
- pub - publication and references
- companalysis - augments sequence module with computational analysis data
- map - non-sequence maps
- genetic - genetic and phenotypic data
- expression - gene expression
- natural diversity - population data

== Software ==
The full list of GMOD software components is found on the GMOD Components page. These components include:

- GMOD Core (Chado database and tools)
  - Chado: the Chado schema and tools to install it.
  - XORT: a tool for loading and dumping chado-xml
  - GMODTools: extracts data from a Chado database into common genome bulk formats (GFF, Fasta, etc.)
- MOD website
  - Tripal: a web front end based on Drupal.
- Genome Editing and Visualization
  - Apollo: a Java application for viewing and editing genome annotations
  - GBrowse: a CGI application for displaying genome annotations
  - JBrowse: a JavaScript application for displaying genome annotations
  - Pathway Tools: a genome browser with a comparative mode
- Comparative Genomics
  - GBrowse_syn: a GBrowse based synteny viewer
  - CMap: a CGI application for displaying comparative maps
- Literature curation
  - Textpresso: a text mining system for scientific literature
- Database querying tools
  - BioMart: a query-oriented data management system
  - InterMine: open source data warehouse system
- Biological Pathways
  - Pathway Tools: tools for metabolic pathway information, and analysis of high-throughput functional genomics data
- Regulatory Networks
  - Pathway Tools: supports definition of regulatory interactions and browsing of regulatory networks
- Analysis
  - Galaxy
  - MAKER

== Participating databases ==
The following organism databases are contributing to and/or adopting GMOD components for model organism databases.

NISEED	AntonosporaDB	Arabidopsis
BeeBase	BeetleBase	Bovine genome database (BGD)
BioHealthBase	Bovine QTL Viewer	Cattle EST Gene Family Database
CGD	CGL	ChromDB
Chromosome 7 Annotation Project	CSHLmpd	Database of Genomic Variants
DictyBase	DroSpeGe	Echinobase	EcoCyc
FlyBase	Fungal Comparative Genomics	Fungal Telomere Browser
Gallus Genome Browser	GeneDB	GrainGenes
Gramene	HapMap	Human 2q33
Human Genome Segmental Duplication Database	IVDB	MAGI
Marine Biological Lab Organism Databases	Mouse Genome Informatics	Non-Human Segmental Duplication Database
OMAP	OryGenesDB	Oryza Chromosome 8
Pathway Tools	ParameciumDB	PeanutMap
PlantsDB	PlasmoDB	PomBase
PseudoCAP	PossumBase	PUMAdb
Rat Genome Database	Saccharomyces Genome Database	SGD Lite
SmedDB	Sol Genomics Network	Soybase
Soybean Gbrowse Database	T1DBase	The Arabidopsis Information Resource
TGD	The Genome Institute	The Institute for Genomic Research
TIGR Rice Genome Browser	ToxoDB	TriAnnot BAC Viewer
VectorBase	wFleaBase	WormBase
XanthusBase	Xenbase

== Related projects ==
- Bioperl, BioJava, Biopython, BioRuby, etc.
- Ensembl
- Gene Ontology
- DAS
- Genomics Unified Schema
- Manatee: Manual Annotation Tool
- Biocurator.org
- Open Biomedical Ontologies
- Sequence Ontology Project

== See also ==
- Biological database
- Genome project
- Genomics
- Genome
