= Hymenoptera Genome Database =

Content
- Description: resources for insect species of the order Hymenoptera.
- Organisms: Hymenoptera

Contact
- Research center: University of Missouri, Columbia, MO, USA.
- Laboratory: Divisions of Animal and Plant Sciences
- Authors: Monica C Munoz-Torres^{a}, Justin T Reese^{a}, Christopher P Childers^{a}, Anna K Bennett, Jaideep P Sundaram, Kevin L Childs, Juan M Anzola, Natalia Milshina, Christine G Elsik (^{a}joint first authors)
- Primary citation: Munoz-Torres MC, Reese JT, Childers CP, Bennett AK, Sundaram JP, Childs KL, Anzola JM, Milshina N, Elsik CG. 2011. Hymenoptera Genome Database: integrated community resources for insect species of the order Hymenoptera. Nucleic Acids Res 39:D658-D662.
- Release date: 2010

Access
- Website: hymenopteragenome.org

The Hymenoptera Genome Database (HGD) is a comprehensive resource supporting genomics of Hymenoptera.

== See also ==
- BeeBase
