= Honey Bee Genome Sequencing Consortium =

The Honey Bee Genome Sequencing Consortium is an international collaborative group of genomics scientists, scientific organisations and universities trying to decipher the genome sequences of the honey bee (Apis mellifera). It was formed in 2001 by American scientists. In the US, the project is funded by the National Human Genome Research Institute (a division of the National Institutes of Health (NIH)), the United States Department of Agriculture (USDA), the Texas Agricultural Experiment Station, the University of Illinois Sociogenomics Initiative, and various beekeepers association and the bee industry.

First scientific findings show that the honey bee genome may have evolved more slowly than the genomes of the fruit fly and malaria mosquito. The bee genome contains versions of some important mammalian genes.

The complete genome of Apis mellifera has been sequenced and consists of 10,000 genes with approximately 236 million base pairs. The size of the genome is a tenth of the human genome. The Western honey bee gene sequence showed 163 chemical receptors for smell but only 10 for taste. Besides the discovery of new genes for the use of pollen and nectar, researchers found that, in comparison with other insects, Apis mellifera has fewer genes for immunity, detoxification and the development of the cuticula. The population genetic analysis showed Africa as the origin and hypothesized that the spread into Europe happened in at least two independent waves.

Data from the scientific collaboration was made available on BeeBase led by Texas A&M University.

BeeSpace led by the University of Illinois is an effort to complete a web navigable catalog of related information.

== See also ==
- List of sequenced eukaryotic genomes
