= BeeBase =

BeeBase was an online bioinformatics database that hosted data related to Apis mellifera, the European honey bee along with some pathogens and other species. It was developed in collaboration with the Honey Bee Genome Sequencing Consortium. In 2020 it was archived and replaced by the Hymenoptera Genome Database.

== Data and services ==
Biological data and services available on BeeBase included:

- DNA and protein sequence data
- official bee gene set (developed by and hosted at Beebase)
- genome browser
- linkage maps
- server to search the honey bee genome using BLAST

=== Services ===
In February 2007, BeeBase consisted of a GBrowser-based genome viewer and a Cmap-based comparative map viewer, both modules of the Generic Model Organism Database (GMOD) project. The genome viewer included tracks for known honey bee genes, predicted gene sets (Ensembl, NCBI, EMBL-Heidelberg), STS markers (Solignac and Hunt linkage maps), honey bee expressed sequence tags (ESTs), homologs in fruit fly, mosquito and other insects and transposable elements. The honey bee comparative map viewer displayed linkage maps and the physical map (genome assembly), highlighting markers that are common among maps.

Additionally, a QTL viewer and a gene expression database were planned. The genome sequence was to serve as a reference to link these diverse data types.

BeeBase organized the community annotation of the bee genome in collaboration with Baylor College of Medicine Human Genome Sequencing Center.

=== Data ===
The now archived site hosts the genome sequence for apis mellifera along with those of the following pathogens:

- Bombus terrestris
- Bombus impatiens

Two additional species were under analysis:

- Apis dorsata
- Apis florea

== See also ==
- Wormbase
- Flybase
- Xenbase
