= Cattle =

- A brown Swiss Fleckvieh cow wearing a cowbell

Conservation status
- Domesticated

Scientific classification
- Kingdom: Animalia
- Phylum: Chordata
- Class: Mammalia
- Order: Artiodactyla
- Family: Bovidae
- Subfamily: Bovinae
- Genus: Bos
- Species: B. taurus

Binomial name
- Bos taurus Linnaeus, 1758
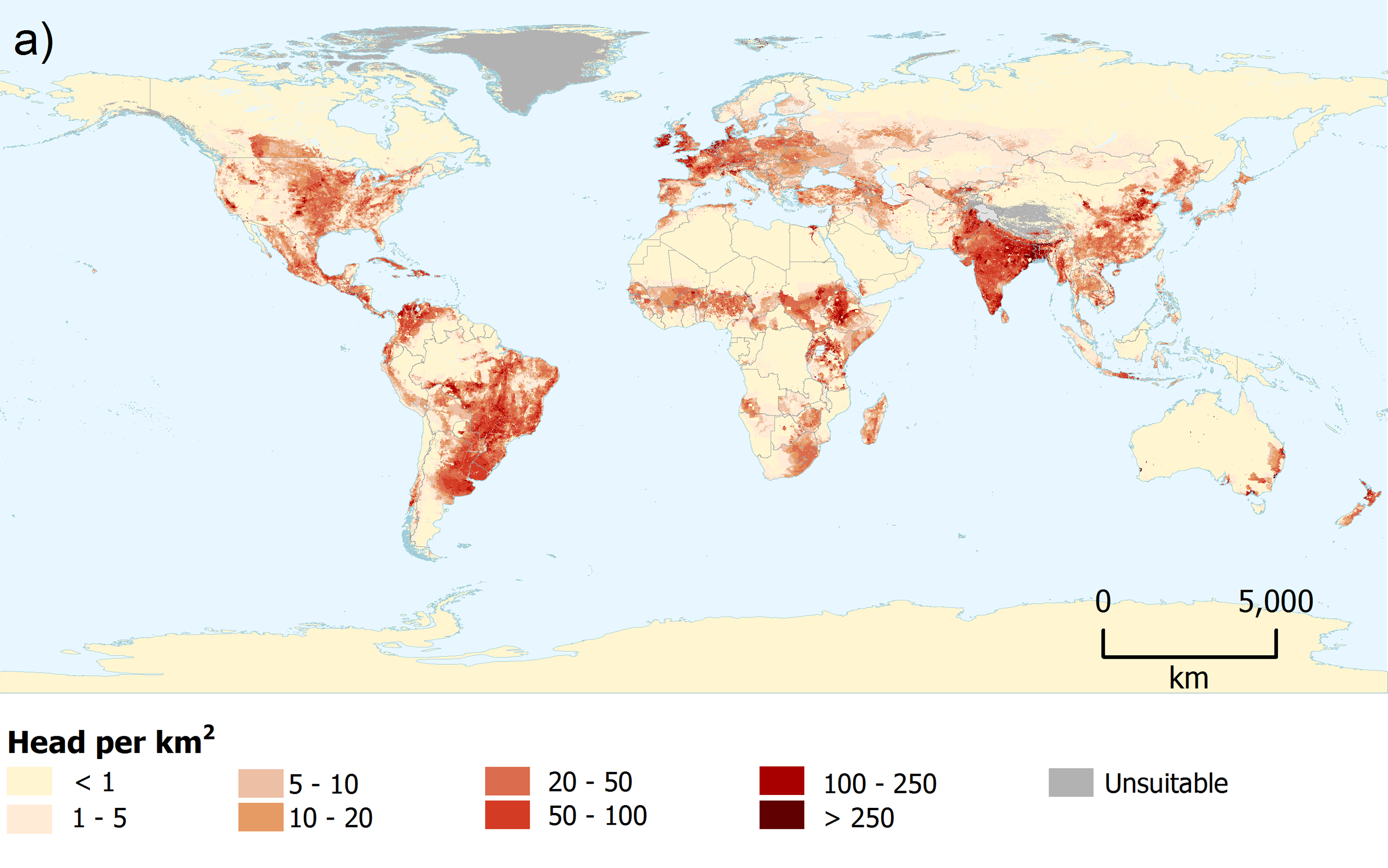
- Bovine distribution

Synonyms
- Bos primigenius taurus; Bos longifrons

Audio

Large, domesticated, cloven-hooved herbivores

Cattle (Bos taurus) (Note: or simply known as a Cow) are large, domesticated, bovid ungulates widely kept as livestock. They are prominent modern members of the subfamily Bovinae and the most widespread species of the genus Bos.

Taurine cattle are widely distributed across Europe and temperate areas of Asia, the Americas, and Australia. Zebus are found mainly in India and tropical areas of Asia, America, and Australia. Sanga cattle are found primarily in sub-Saharan Africa. These types, sometimes classified as separate species or subspecies, are further divided into over 1,000 recognized breeds.

Cattle are commonly raised for meat, for dairy products, and for leather. As draft animals, they pull carts and farm implements. Cattle are considered sacred animals within Hinduism, and it is illegal to kill them in some parts of the Indian subcontinent. Small breeds such as the miniature Zebu are kept as pets.

About 10,500 years ago, taurine cattle were domesticated from wild aurochs progenitors in central Anatolia, the Levant and Western Iran. A separate domestication event occurred in the Indian subcontinent, which gave rise to zebu. There were over 940 million cattle in the world by 2022. Cattle farming is responsible for about 7% of global greenhouse gas emissions. They were one of the first domesticated animals to have a fully-mapped genome.

== Etymology ==
The term cattle was borrowed from Anglo-Norman catel (replacing native Old English terms like kine, now considered archaic, poetic, or dialectal), itself from Medieval Latin capitāle 'principal sum of money, capital', itself derived in turn from Latin caput 'head'. Cattle originally meant movable personal property, especially livestock of any kind, as opposed to real property (the land, which also included wild or small free-roaming animals such as chickens—they were sold as part of the land). The word is a variant of chattel (a unit of personal property) and closely related to capital in the economic sense. The word cow came via Old English cū (plural cȳ), from Proto-Indo-European *gʷṓws (genitive *gʷéws) 'a bovine animal', cf. Persian: gâv, Sanskrit: gó. In older English sources such as the King James Version of the Bible, cattle often means livestock, as opposed to deer, which are wild.

== Characteristics ==
=== Description ===
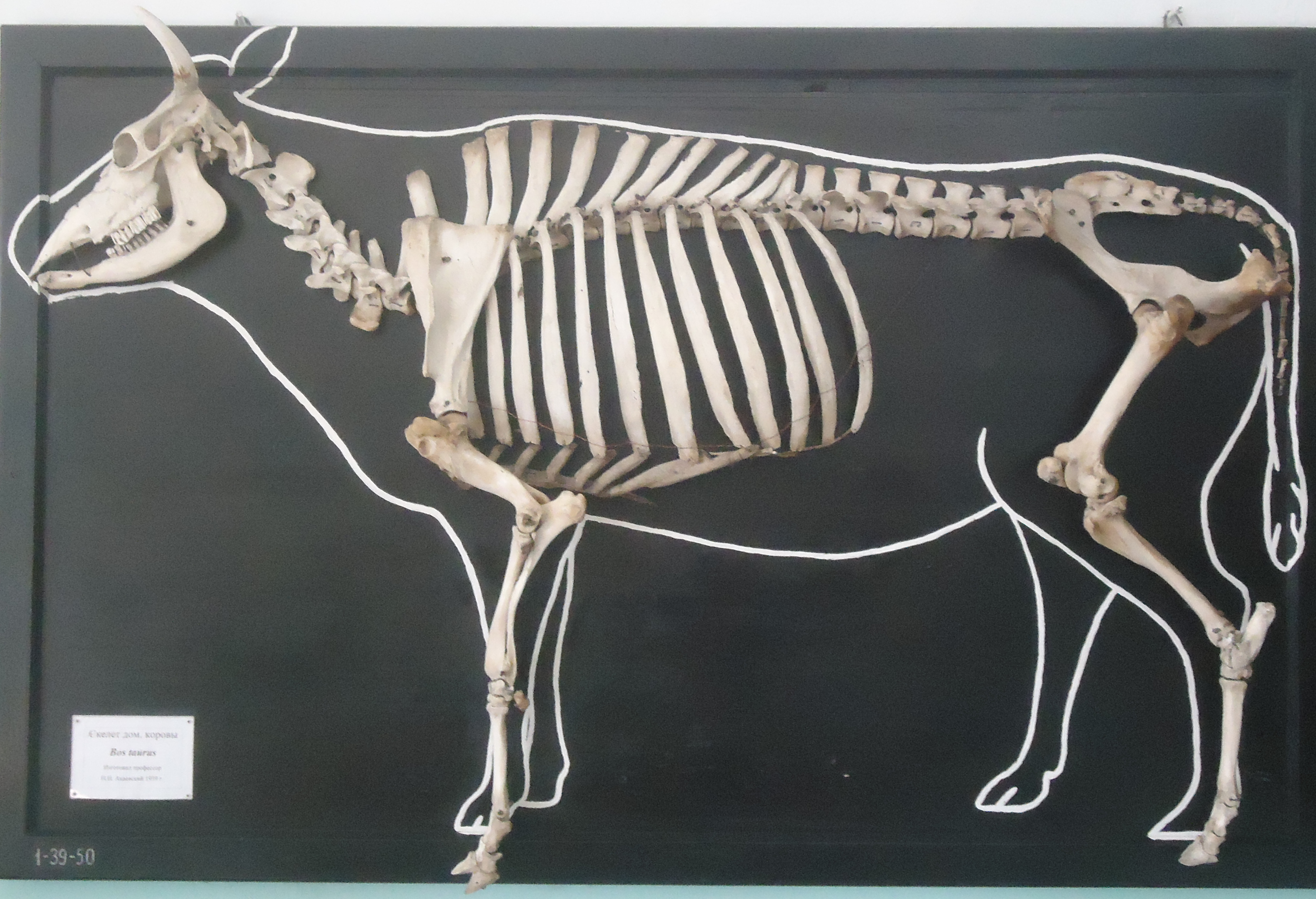
Skeleton

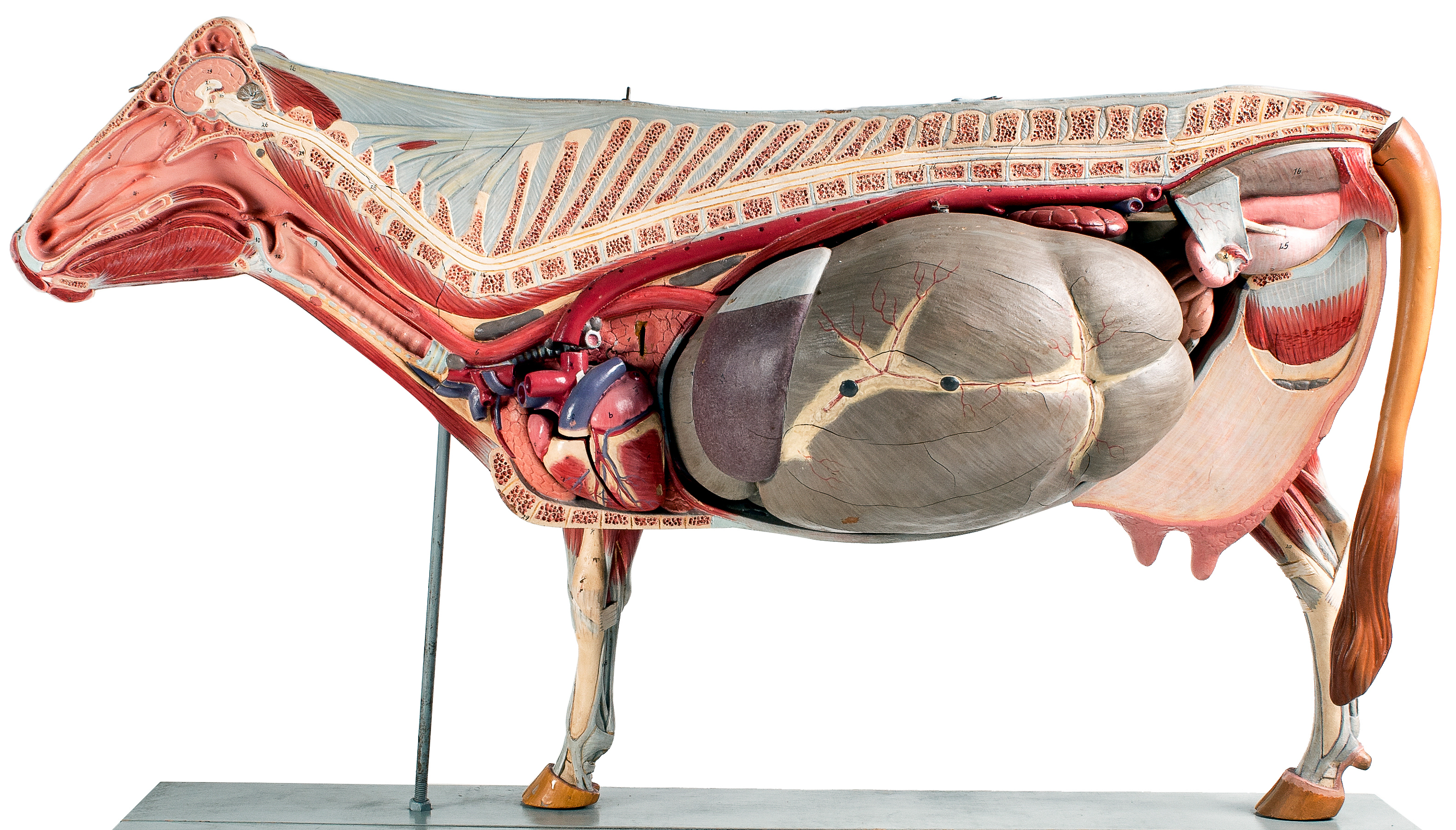
Anatomical model, showing the large 4-chambered stomach

Cattle are large artiodactyls, mammals with cloven hooves, meaning that they walk on two toes, the third and fourth digits. Like all bovid species, they can have horns, which are unbranched and are not shed annually. Coloration varies with breed; common colors are black, white, and red/brown, and some breeds are spotted or have mixed colors. Bulls are larger than cows of the same breed by up to a few hundred kilograms. British Hereford cows, for example, weigh 600–800 kg (1,300–1,800 lb), while the bulls weigh 1,000–1,200 kg (2,200–2,600 lb). Cattle breeds vary widely in size; the tallest and heaviest is the Chianina, where a mature bull may be up to 1.8 m (5 ft 11 in) at the shoulder, and may reach 1,280 kg (2,820 lb) in weight. The natural life of domestic cattle is some 25–30 years. Beef cattle go to slaughter at about 18 months, and dairy cows at about five years.

=== Digestive system ===
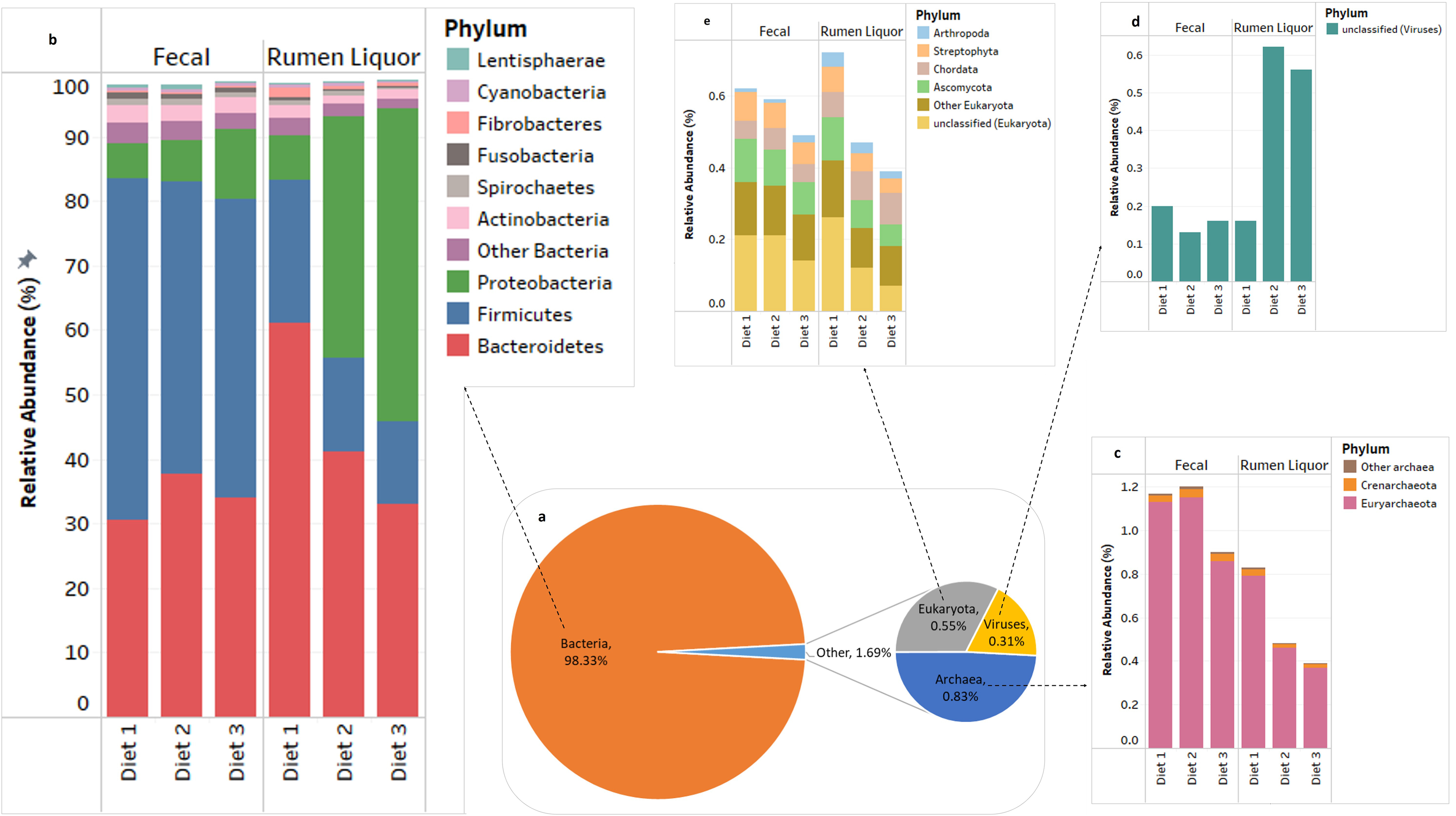
Bacteria dominate the rumen microbiome; composition can change substantially with diet.

Cattle are ruminants, meaning their digestive system is highly specialized for processing plant material such as grass rich in cellulose, a tough carbohydrate polymer which many animals cannot digest. They do this in symbiosis with micro-organisms – bacteria, fungi, and protozoa – that possess cellulases, enzymes that split cellulose into its constituent sugars. Among the many bacteria that contribute are Fibrobacter succinogenes, Ruminococcus flavefaciens, and Ruminococcus albus. Cellulolytic fungi include several species of Neocallimastix, while the protozoa include the ciliates Eudiplodinium maggie and Ostracodinium album. If the animal's feed changes over time, the composition of this microbiome changes in response.

Cattle have one large stomach with four compartments; the rumen, reticulum, omasum, and abomasum. The rumen is the largest compartment and it harbours the most important parts of the microbiome. The reticulum, the smallest compartment, is known as the "honeycomb". The omasum's main function is to absorb water and nutrients from the digestible feed. The abomasum has a similar function to the human stomach.

Cattle regurgitate and re-chew their food in the process of chewing the cud, like most ruminants. While feeding, cows swallow their food without chewing; it goes into the rumen for storage. Later, the food is regurgitated to the mouth, a mouthful at a time, where the cud is chewed by the molars, grinding down the coarse vegetation to small particles. The cud is then swallowed again and further digested by the micro-organisms in the cow's stomach.

=== Reproduction ===
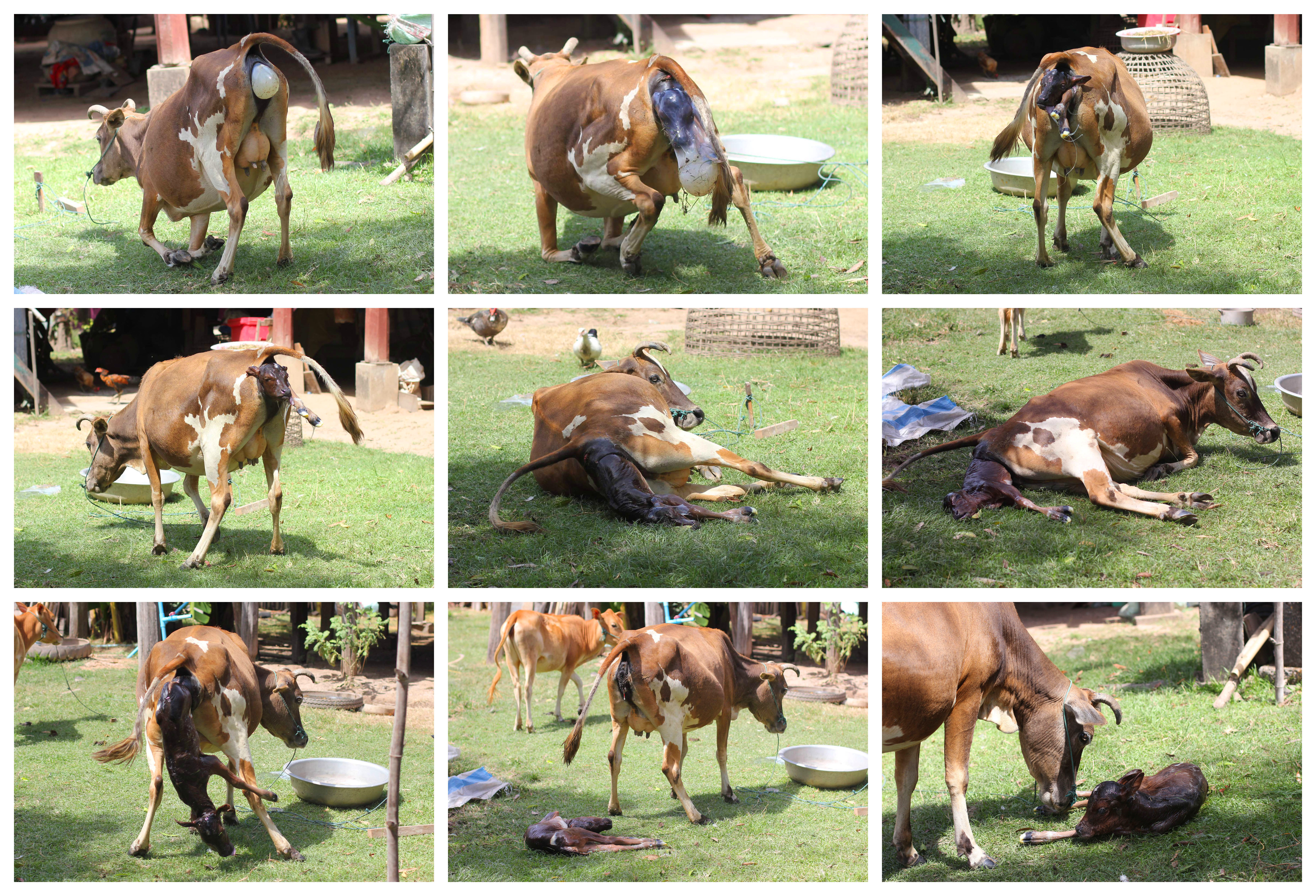
A cow giving birth

The gestation period for a cow is about nine months long. The ratio of male to female offspring at birth is approximately 52:48. A cow's udder has two pairs of mammary glands or teats. Farms often use artificial insemination, the artificial deposition of semen in the female's genital tract; this allows farmers to choose from a wide range of bulls to breed their cattle. Estrus too may be artificially induced to facilitate the process. Copulation lasts several seconds and consists of a single pelvic thrust.

Cows seek secluded areas for calving. After their first mating, semi-wild Highland cattle heifers first give birth at 2 or 3 years of age, and the timing of birth is synchronized with increases in natural food quality. Average calving interval is 391 days, and calving mortality within the first year of life is 5%. Beef calves suckle an average of 5 times per day, spending some 46 minutes suckling. There is a diurnal rhythm in suckling, peaking at roughly 6am, 11:30am, and 7pm. Under natural conditions, calves stay with their mother until weaning at 8 to 11 months. Heifer and bull calves are equally attached to their mothers in the first few months of life.

=== Cognition ===
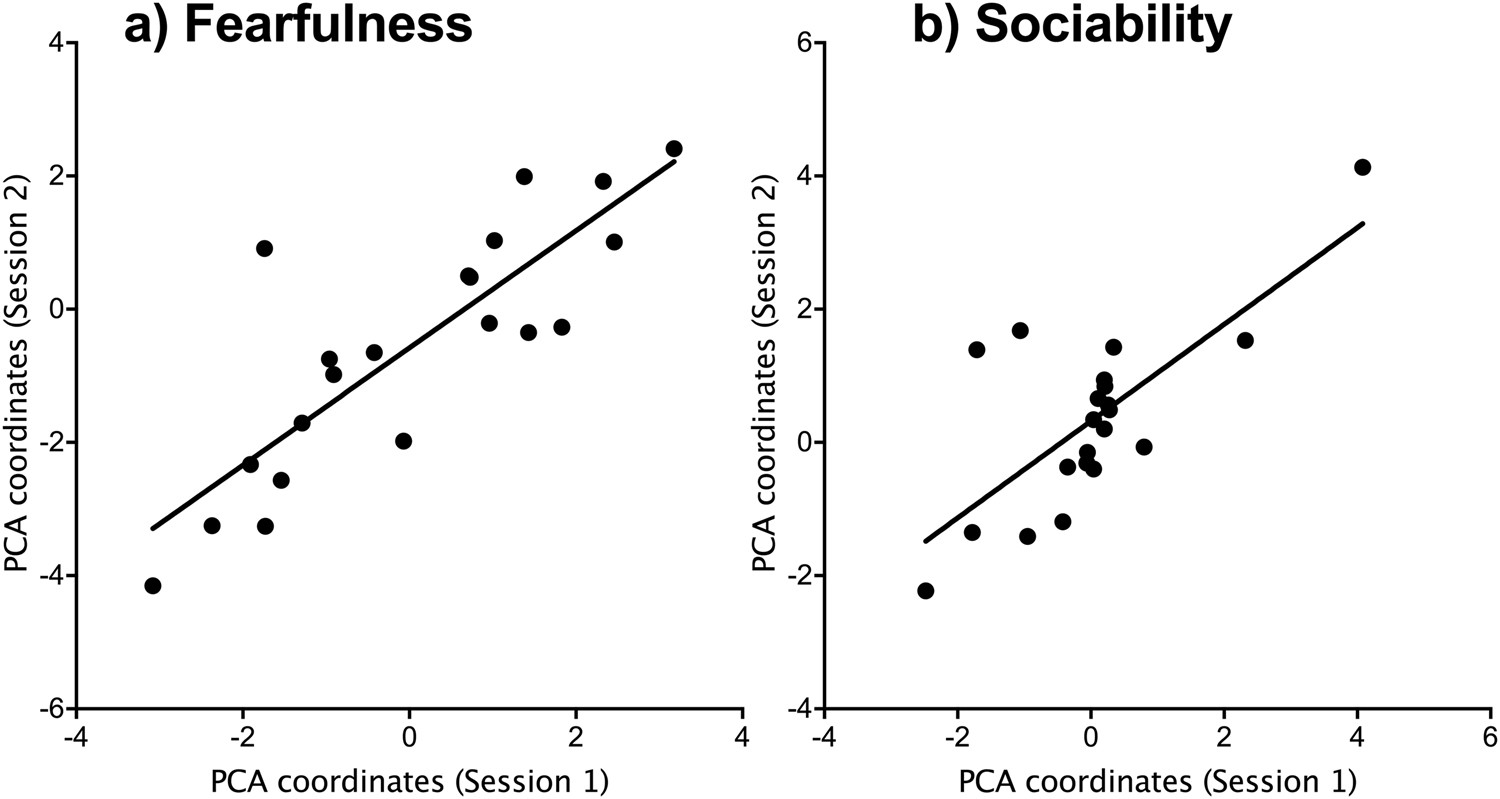
Individual cattle differ in personality traits such as fearfulness and sociability.

Cattle have a variety of cognitive abilities. They can memorize the locations of multiple food sources, and can retain memories for at least 48 days. Young cattle learn more quickly than adults. Calves are capable of discrimination learning, distinguishing familiar and unfamiliar animals, and between humans, using faces and other cues. Calves prefer their own mother's vocalizations to those of an unfamiliar cow. Vocalizations provide information on the age, sex, dominance status and reproductive status of the caller, and may indicate estrus in cows and competitive display in bulls. Cows can categorize images as familiar and unfamiliar individuals. Cloned calves from the same donor form subgroups, suggesting that kin discrimination may be a basis of grouping behaviour. Cattle use visual/brain lateralisation when scanning novel and familiar stimuli. They prefer to view novel stimuli with the left eye (using the right brain hemisphere), but the right eye for familiar stimuli. Individual cattle have also been observed to display different personality traits, such as fearfulness and sociability. A case of multi-purpose tool use has been documented, where a cow named Veronika uses different ends of a deck brush to scratch different parts of her body.

=== Senses ===
Vision is the dominant sense; cattle obtain almost half of their information visually. Being prey animals, cattle evolved to look out for predators almost all around, with eyes that are on the sides of their head rather than the front. This gives them a field of view of 330°, but limits binocular vision (and therefore stereopsis) to some 30° to 50°, compared to 140° in humans. They are dichromatic, like most mammals. Cattle avoid bitter-tasting foods, selecting sweet foods for energy. Their sensitivity to sour-tasting foods helps them to maintain optimal ruminal pH. They seek out salty foods by taste and smell to maintain their electrolyte balance. Their hearing is better than that of horses, but worse at localising sounds than goats, and much worse than dogs or humans. They can distinguish between live and recorded human speech. Olfaction probably plays a large role in their social life, indicating social and reproductive status. Cattle can tell when other animals are stressed by smelling the alarm chemicals in their urine. Cattle can be trained to recognise conspecific individuals using olfaction only.

== Behavior ==
=== Dominance hierarchy ===
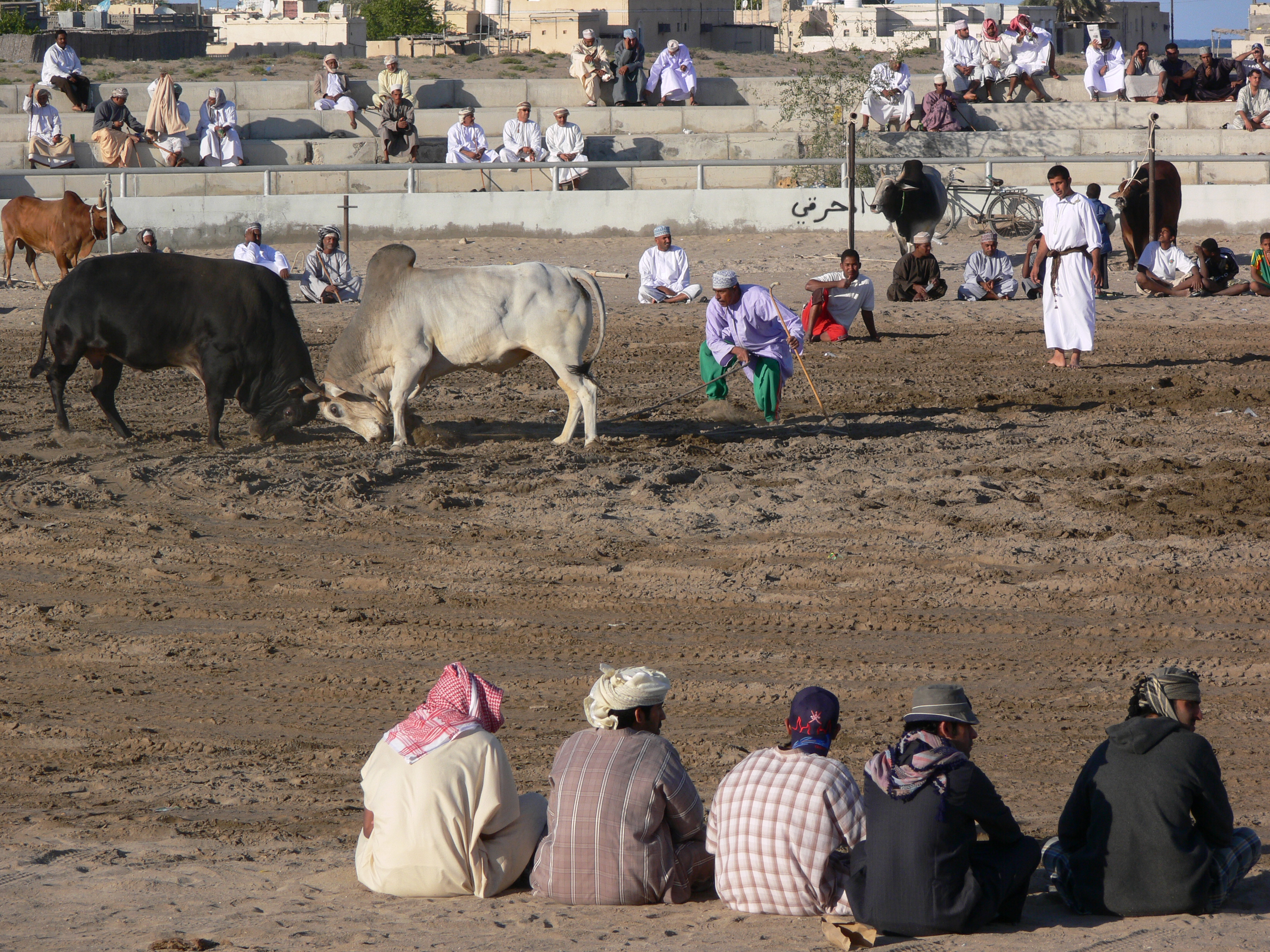
Spectators in Oman watch a fight between bulls.

Cattle live in a dominance hierarchy. This is maintained in several ways. Cattle often engage in mock fights where they test each other's strength in a non-aggressive way. Licking is primarily performed by subordinates and received by dominant animals. Mounting is a playful behavior shown by calves of both sexes and by bulls and sometimes by cows in estrus, however, this is not a dominance related behavior as has been found in other species. Dominance-associated aggressiveness does not correlate with rank position, but is closely related to rank distance between individuals. The horns of cattle are used in mate selection. Horned cattle attempt to keep greater distances between themselves and have fewer physical interactions than hornless cattle, resulting in more stable social relationships. In calves, agonistic behavior becomes less frequent as space allowance increases, but not as group size changes, whereas in adults, the number of agonistic encounters increases with group size.

Dominance relationships in semi-wild highland cattle are very firm, with few overt aggressive conflicts: most disputes are settled by agonistic (non-aggressive, competitive) behaviors with no physical contact between opponents, reducing the risk of injury. Dominance status depends on age and sex, with older animals usually dominant to young ones and males dominant to females. Young bulls gain superior dominance status over adult cows when they reach about 2 years of age.

=== Grazing behavior ===
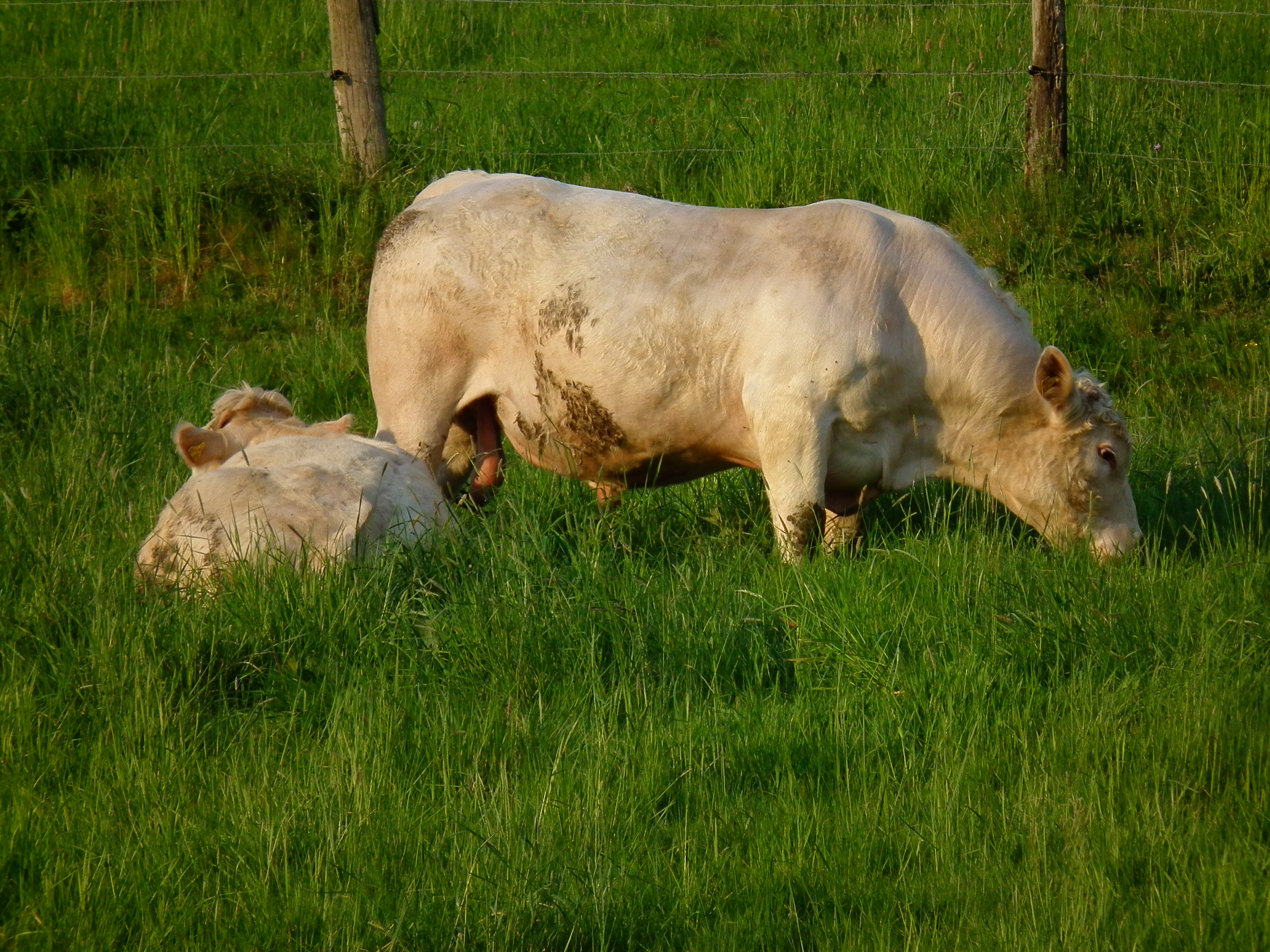
A Charolais bull grazing

Cattle eat mixed diets, but prefer to eat approximately 70% clover and 30% grass. This preference has a diurnal pattern, with a stronger preference for clover in the morning, and the proportion of grass increasing towards the evening. When grazing, cattle vary several aspects of their bite, i.e. tongue and jaw movements, depending on characteristics of the plant they are eating. Bite area decreases with the density of the plants but increases with their height. Bite area is determined by the sweep of the tongue; in one study observing 750-kilogram (1,650 lb) steers, bite area reached a maximum of approximately 170 cm^{2} (30 sq in). Bite depth increases with the height of the plants. By adjusting their behavior, cattle obtain heavier bites in swards that are tall and sparse compared with short, dense swards of equal mass/area. Cattle adjust other aspects of their grazing behavior in relation to the available food; foraging velocity decreases and intake rate increases in areas of abundant palatable forage. Cattle avoid grazing areas contaminated by the faeces of other cattle more strongly than they avoid areas contaminated by sheep, but they do not avoid pasture contaminated by rabbits.

=== Temperament and emotions ===
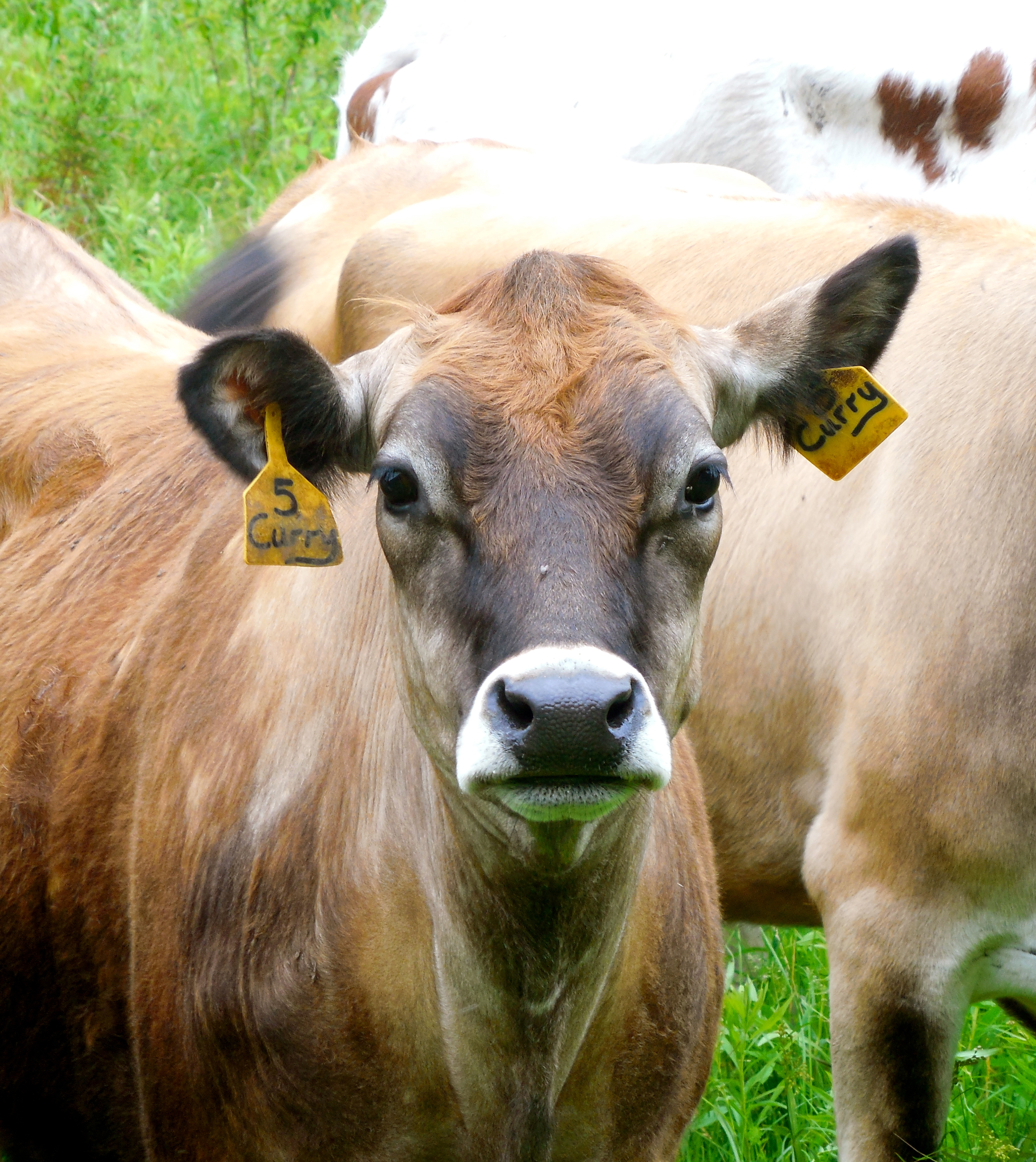
Ear postures of cows indicate emotional state and overall welfare.

In cattle, temperament or behavioral disposition can affect productivity, overall health, and reproduction. Five underlying categories of temperament traits have been proposed: shyness–boldness, exploration–avoidance, activity, aggressiveness, and sociability. There are many indicators of emotion in cattle. Holstein–Friesian heifers that had made clear improvements in a learning experiment had higher heart rates, indicating an emotional reaction to their own learning. After separation from their mothers, Holstein calves react, indicating low mood. Similarly, after hot-iron dehorning, calves react to the post-operative pain. The position of the ears has been used as an indicator of emotional state. Cattle can tell when other cattle are stressed by the chemicals in their urine. Cattle are gregarious, and even short-term isolation causes psychological stress. When heifers are isolated, vocalizations, heart rate and plasma cortisol all increase. When visual contact is re-instated, vocalizations rapidly decline; heart rate decreases more rapidly if the returning cattle are familiar to the previously isolated individual. Mirrors have been used to reduce stress in isolated cattle.

=== Sleep ===
The average sleep time of a domestic cow is about 4 hours a day. Cattle do have a stay apparatus, but do not sleep standing up; they lie down to sleep deeply.

== Genetics ==
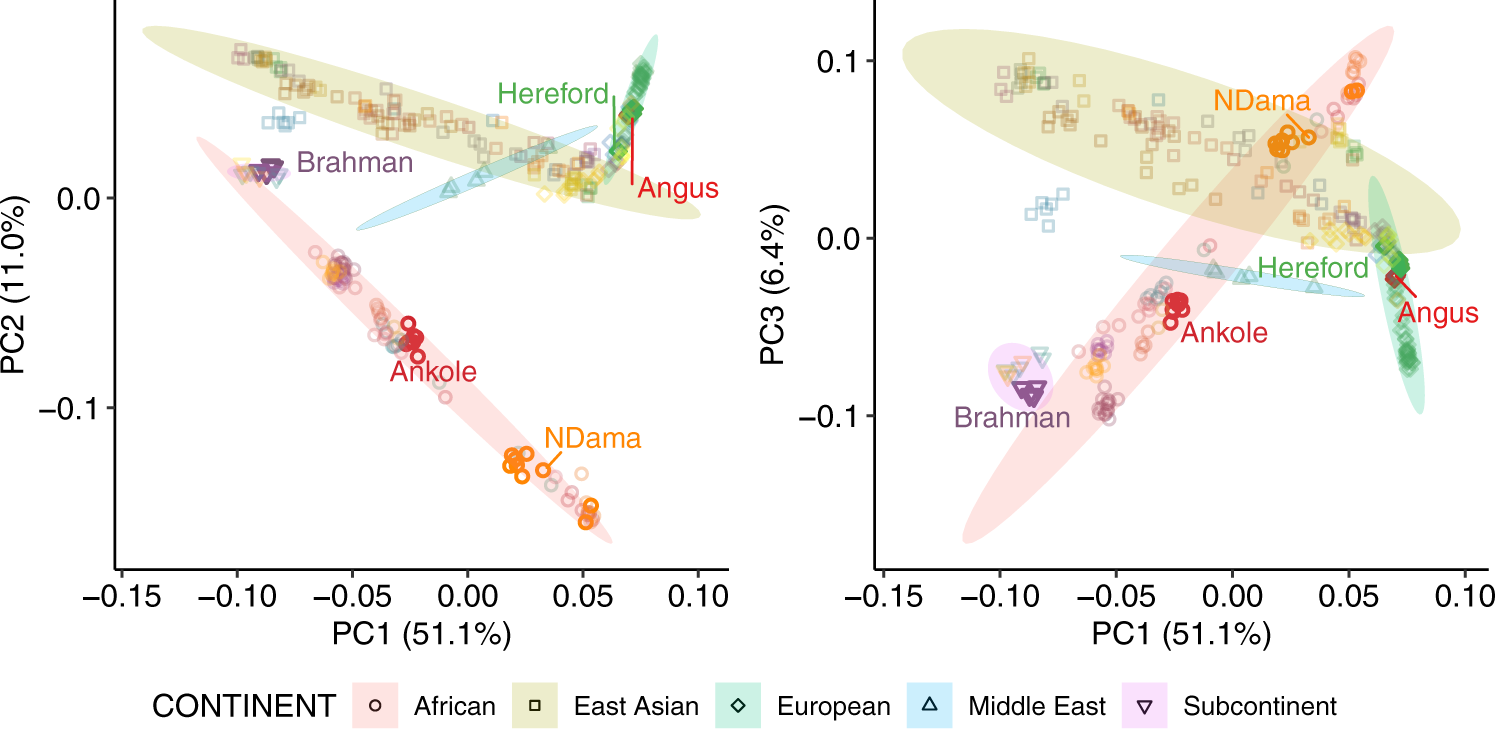
Genomic analysis shows there are five main cattle sub-types, here labelled by continent.

In 2009, the National Institutes of Health and the US Department of Agriculture reported having mapped the bovine genome. Cattle have some 22,000 genes, of which 80% are shared with humans; they have about 1000 genes that they share with dogs and rodents, but not with humans. Using this bovine "HapMap", researchers can track the differences between breeds that affect meat and milk yields. Early research focused on Hereford genetic sequences; a wider study mapped a further 4.2% of the cattle genome.

Behavioral traits of cattle can be as heritable as some production traits, and often, the two can be related. The heritability of temperament (response to isolation during handling) has been calculated as 0.36 and 0.46 for habituation to handling. Rangeland assessments show that the heritability of aggressiveness in cattle is about 0.36.

Quantitative trait loci have been found for a range of production and behavioral characteristics for both dairy and beef cattle.

== Evolution ==
=== Phylogeny ===
Cattle have played a key role in human history, having been domesticated since at least the early Neolithic age. Archaeozoological and genetic data indicate that cattle were first domesticated from wild aurochs (Bos primigenius) approximately 10,500 years ago. There were two major areas of domestication: one in central Anatolia, the Levant, and Western Iran, which gave rise to the taurine line, and a second in the area that is now Pakistan, which produced the indicine line. Modern mitochondrial DNA variation indicates the taurine line may have arisen from as few as 80 aurochs tamed in the upper reaches of Mesopotamia near the villages of Çayönü Tepesi, in what is now southeastern Turkey, and Dja'de el-Mughara, in what is now northern Syria.

Although European cattle are largely descended from the taurine lineage, gene flow from African cattle (partially of indicine origin) contributed substantial genomic components to both southern European cattle breeds and their New World descendants. A study on 134 breeds showed that modern taurine cattle originated from Africa, Asia, North and South America, Australia, and Europe. Some researchers have suggested that African taurine cattle are derived from a third independent domestication from the North African aurochs. Whether there have been two or three domestications, European, African, and Asian cattle share much of their genomes, both through their species ancestry and through repeated migrations of livestock and genetic material between species, as shown in the diagram.

=== Taxonomy ===
Cattle phylogeny and migrations involve two major species, at least two domestications, and migrations between these.

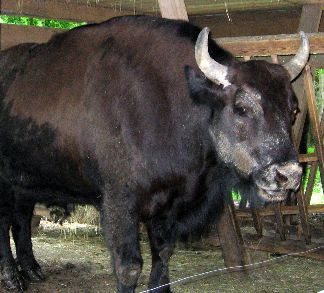
Żubroń, a European bison–cattle hybrid

Cattle were originally identified as three separate species: Bos taurus, the European or "taurine" cattle (including similar types from Africa and Asia); Bos indicus, the Indicine or "zebu"; and the extinct Bos primigenius, the aurochs. The aurochs is ancestral to both zebu and taurine cattle. They were later reclassified as one species, Bos taurus, with the aurochs (B. t. primigenius), zebu (B. t. indicus), and taurine (B. t. taurus) cattle as subspecies. However, this taxonomy is contentious, and authorities such as the American Society of Mammalogists treat these taxa as separate species.

Complicating the matter is the ability of cattle to interbreed with other closely related species. Hybrid individuals and even breeds exist, not only between taurine cattle and zebu (such as the sanga cattle (Bos taurus africanus x Bos indicus), but also between one or both of these and some other members of the genus Bos – yaks (the dzo or yattle), banteng, and gaur. Hybrids such as the beefalo breed can even occur between taurine cattle and either species of bison, leading some authors to consider the latter part of the genus Bos, as well. The hybrid origin of some types may not be obvious – for example, genetic testing of the Dwarf Lulu breed, the only taurine-type cattle in Nepal, found them to be a mix of taurine cattle, zebu, and yak.

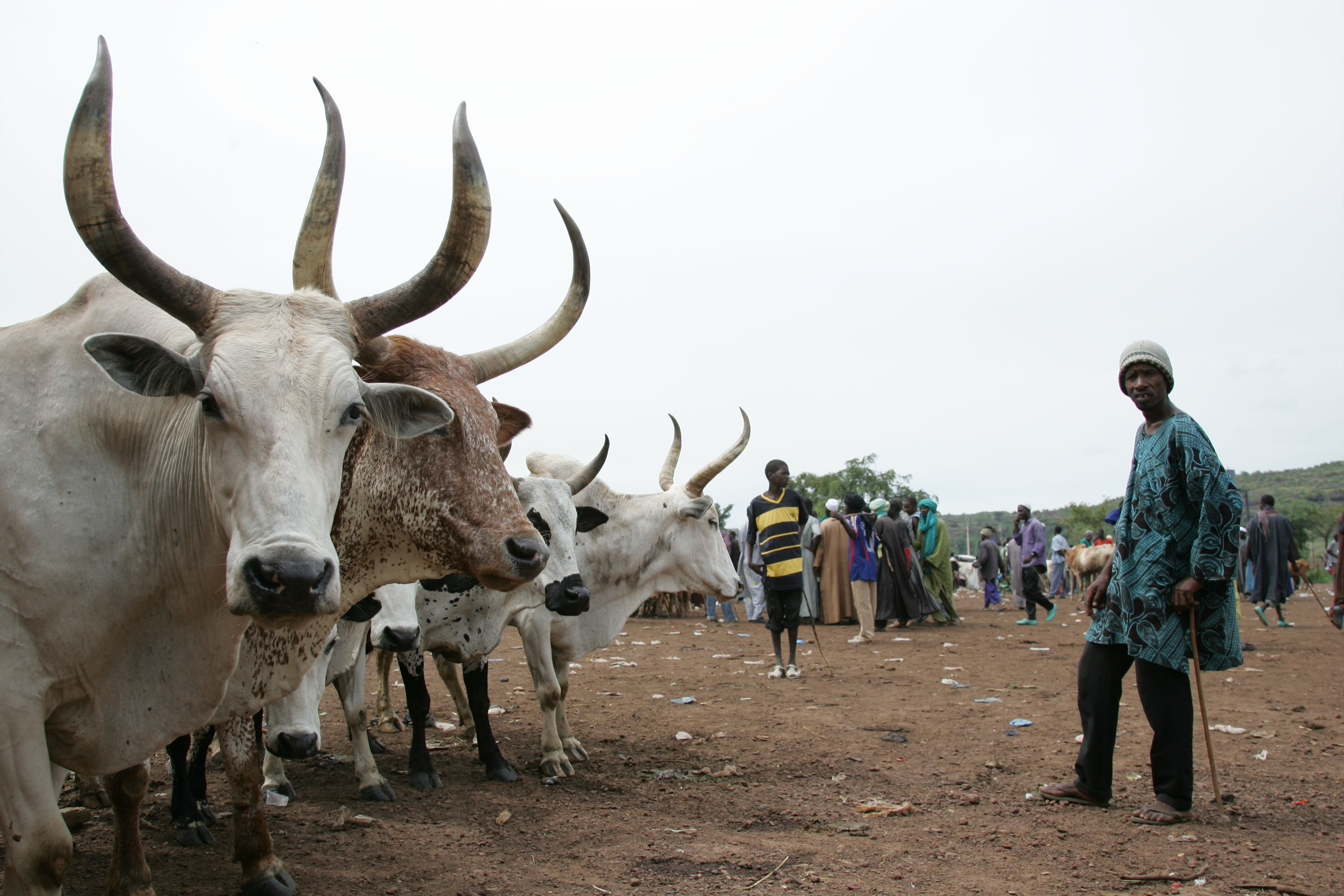
N'dama cattle in a livestock market in Mali

The aurochs originally ranged throughout Europe, North Africa, and much of Asia. In historical times, its range became restricted to Europe, and the last known individual died in Mazovia, Poland, around 1627. Breeders have attempted to recreate a similar appearance to that of the aurochs by crossing traditional types of domesticated cattle, producing the Heck breed.

A group of taurine-type cattle exist in Africa; these represent either an independent domestication event or the result of crossing taurines domesticated elsewhere with local aurochs, but they are genetically distinct; some authors name them as a separate subspecies, Bos taurus africanus. The only pure African taurine breeds remaining are the N'Dama, Kuri and some varieties of the West African Shorthorn.

Feral cattle are those that have been allowed to go wild. Feral populations exist in many parts of the world, sometimes on small islands. Some, such as Amsterdam Island cattle, Chillingham cattle, and Aleutian wild cattle, have become sufficiently distinct to be described as breeds.

== Husbandry ==
=== Practices ===
In concentrated animal feeding operations, the cattle are not allowed to wander and graze, as food is brought to them in a feedlot.

Cattle are often raised by allowing herds to graze on the grasses of large tracts of rangeland. Raising cattle extensively in this manner allows the use of land that might be unsuitable for growing crops. The most common interactions with cattle involve daily feeding, cleaning and milking. Many routine husbandry practices involve ear tagging, dehorning, loading, medical operations, artificial insemination, vaccinations and hoof care, as well as training for agricultural shows and preparations. Around the world, Fulani husbandry rests on behavioural techniques, whereas in Europe, cattle are controlled primarily by physical means, such as fences. Breeders use cattle husbandry to reduce tuberculosis susceptibility by selective breeding and maintaining herd health to avoid concurrent disease.

In the United States, many cattle are raised intensively, kept in concentrated animal feeding operations, meaning there are at least 700 mature dairy cows or at least 1000 other cattle stabled or confined in a feedlot for "45 days or more in a 12-month period".

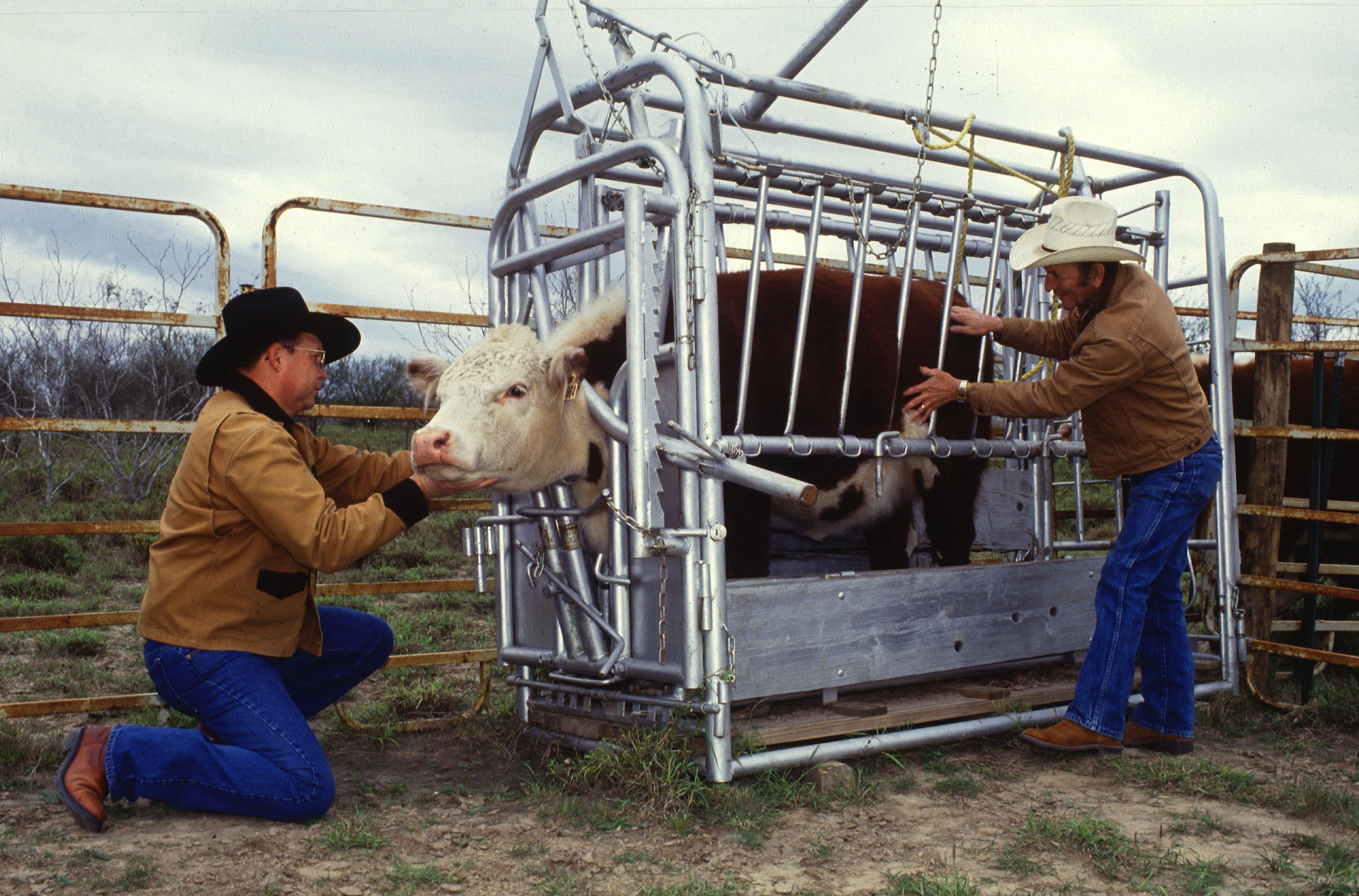
A Hereford being inspected for ticks. Cattle are often restrained in cattle crushes when given medical attention.

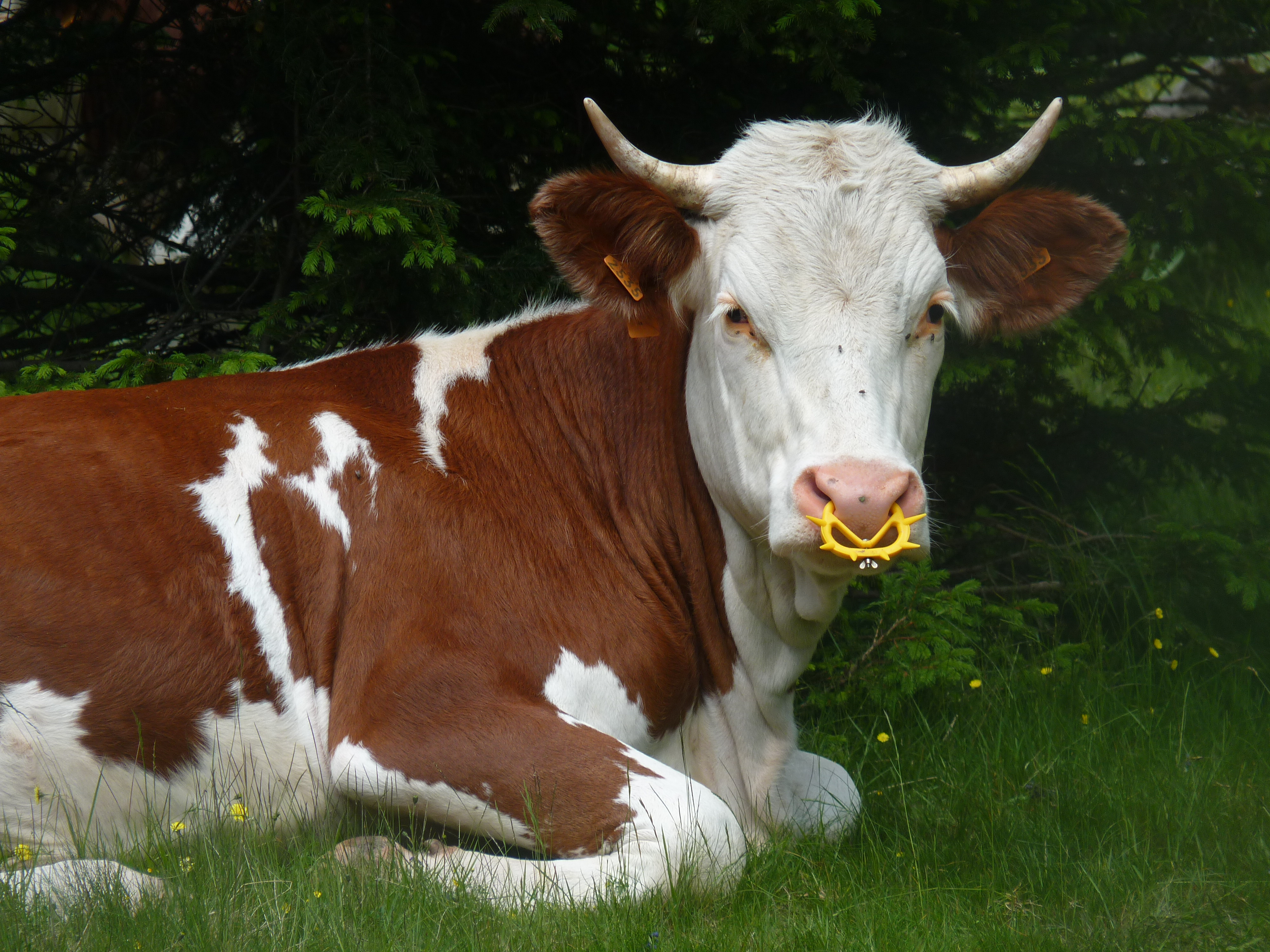
A calf with a nose ring to prevent it from suckling, usually to assist in weaning

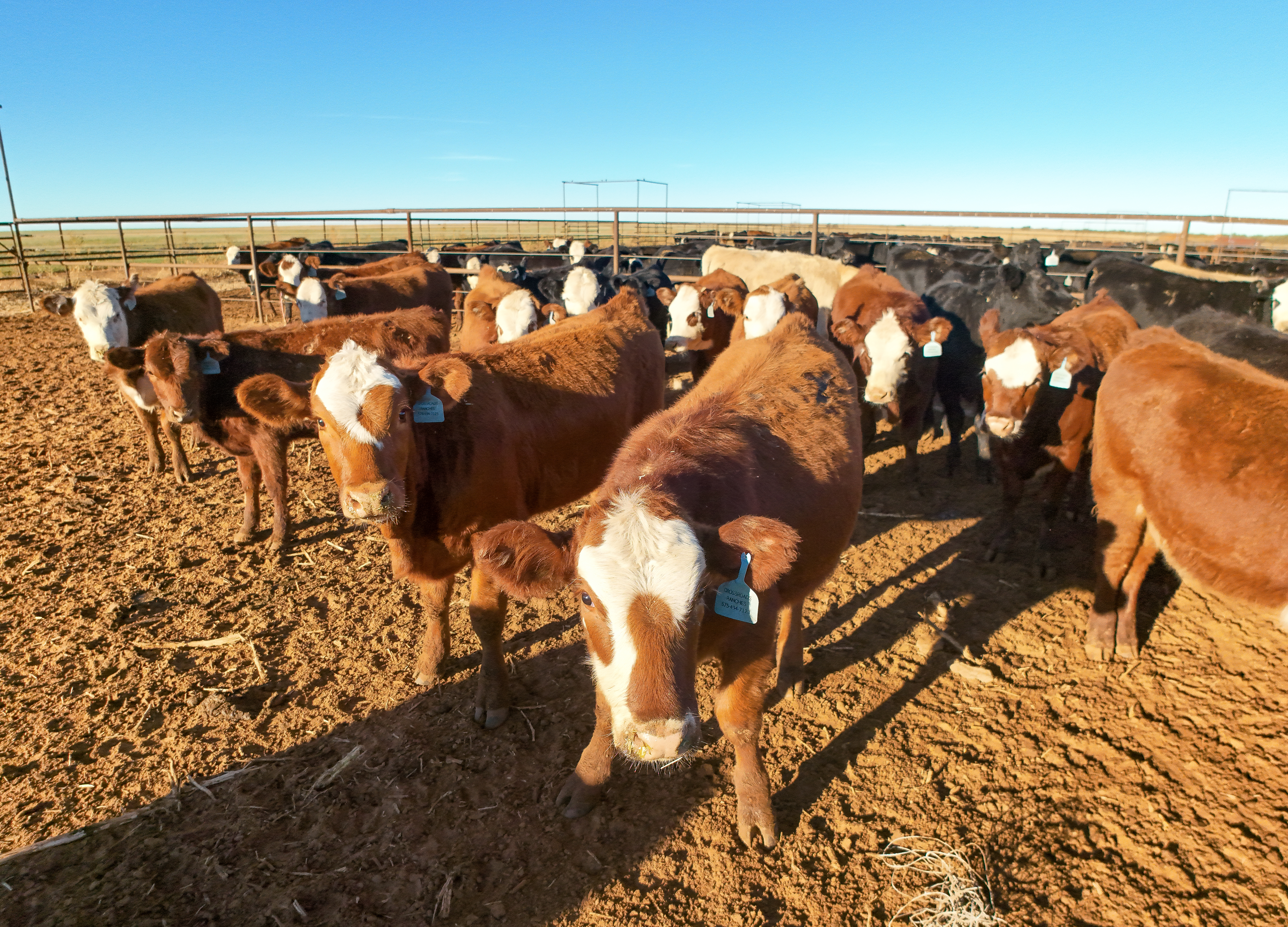
Cattle feedlot in New Mexico, United States

=== Population ===
Live cattle

Historically, the cattle population of Britain rose from 9.8 million in 1878 to 11.7 million in 1908, but beef consumption rose much faster. Britain became the "stud farm of the world" exporting livestock to countries where there were no indigenous cattle. In 1929 80% of the meat trade of the world was products of what were originally English breeds. There were nearly 70 million cattle in the US by the early 1930s.

Cattle have the largest biomass of any animal species on Earth, at roughly 650 million tonnes. In 2023, the countries with the most cattle were India with 307.5 million (32.6% of the total), Brazil with 194.4 million, and China with 101.5 million, out of a total of 942.6 million in the world.

== Economy ==
Cattle are kept on farms to produce meat, milk, and leather, and sometimes to pull carts or farm implements.

=== Meat ===
The meat of adult cattle is known as beef, and that of calves as veal. Other body parts are used as food products, including blood, liver, kidney, heart and oxtail. Approximately 300 million cattle, including dairy animals, are slaughtered each year for food. About a quarter of the world's meat comes from cattle. World cattle meat production in 2021 was 72.3 million tons.

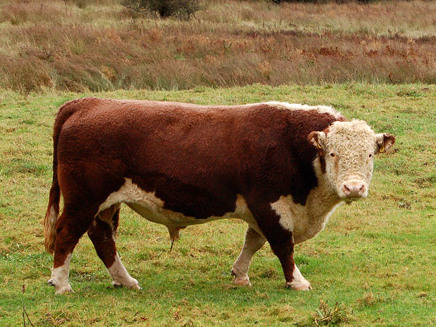
The Hereford is a widespread beef breed, introduced in the 18th century

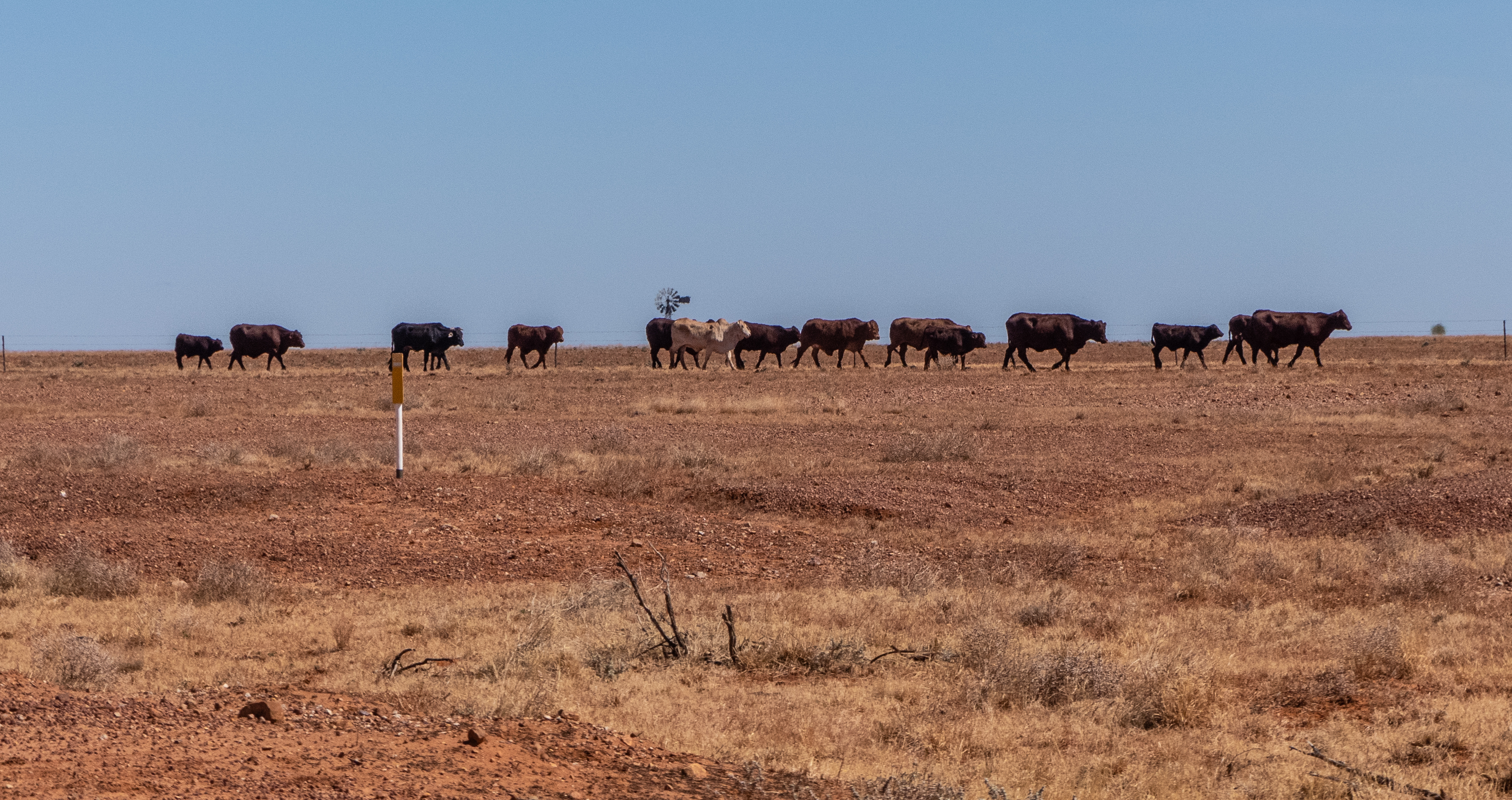
Australian Droughtmaster cattle on an extensive farm in Queensland, Australia

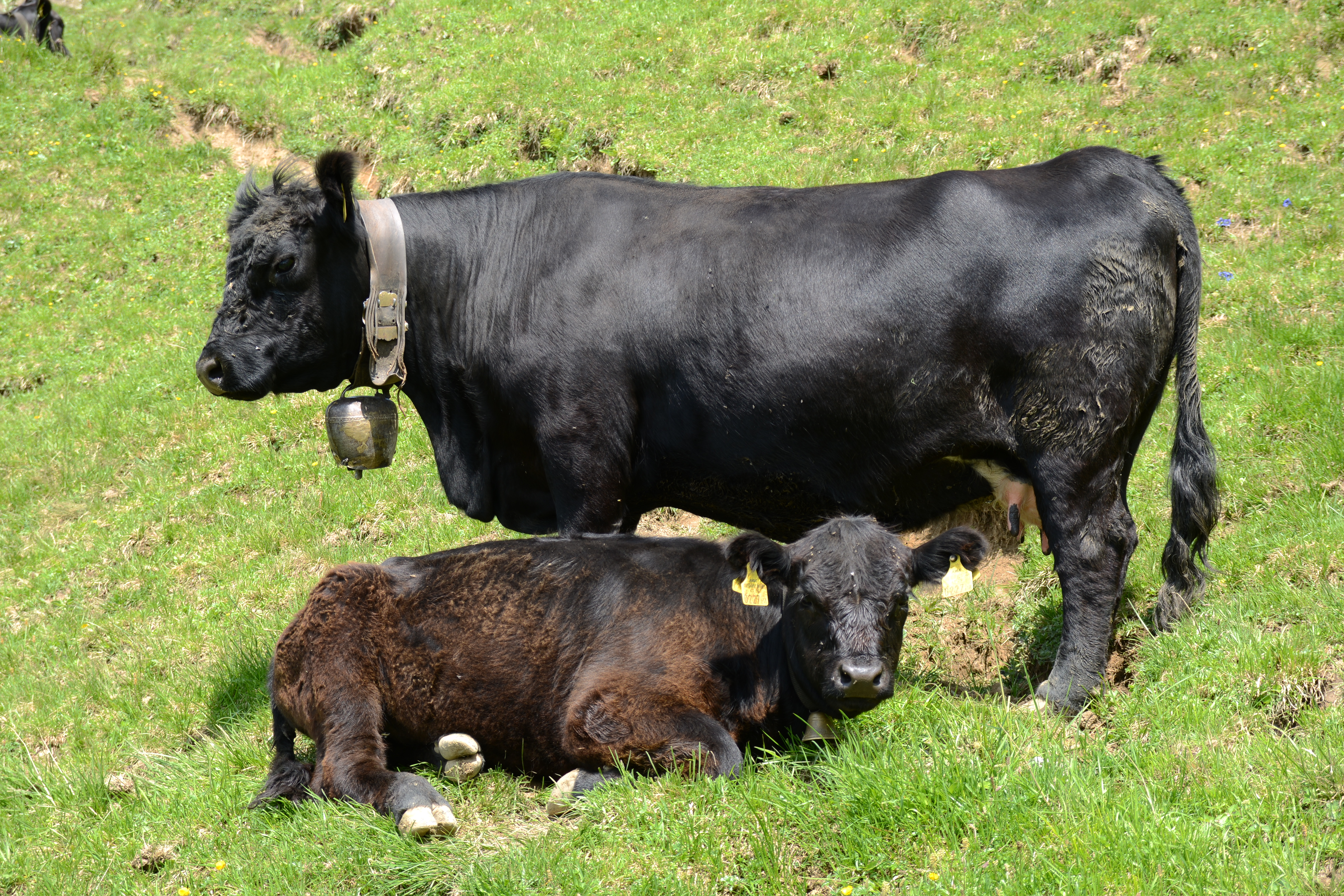
Aberdeen Angus, a popular small breed, shown here in Austria with a traditional cattle bell
FAO data for 2021

Beef is the third most commonly consumed meat worldwide.

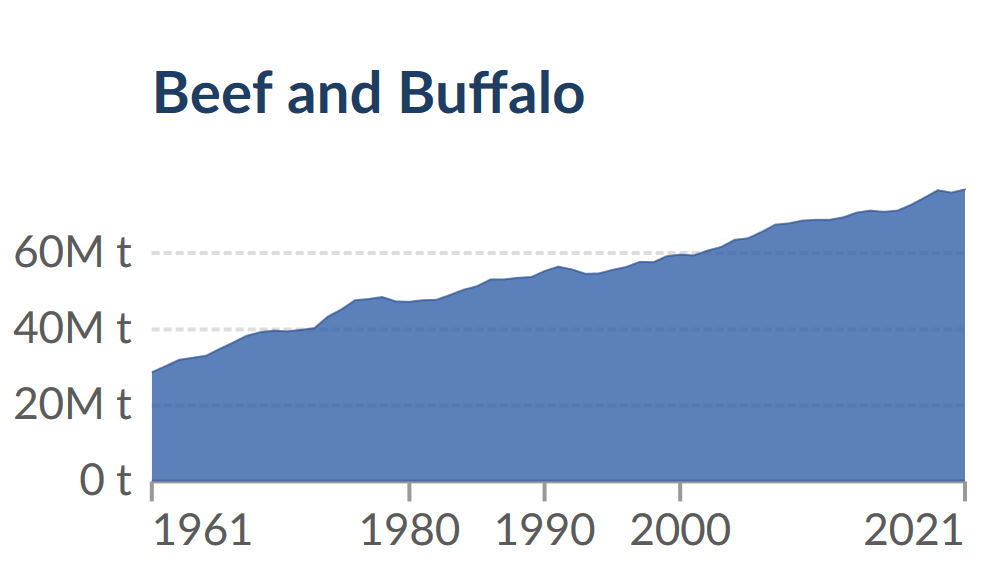
Beef (and buffalo meat) production has grown substantially over the recent 60 years.

Production of beef worldwide, by country in 2021.

=== Dairy ===
Certain breeds of cattle, such as the Holstein-Friesian, are used to produce milk, much of which is processed into dairy products such as butter, cheese, and yogurt. Dairy cattle are usually kept on specialized dairy farms designed for milk production. Most cows are milked twice per day, with milk processed at a dairy, which may be onsite at the farm or the milk may be shipped to a dairy plant for eventual sale of a dairy product. Lactation is induced in heifers and spayed cows by a combination of physical and psychological stimulation, by drugs, or by a combination of those methods. For mother cows to continue producing milk, they give birth to one calf per year. If the calf is male, it is generally slaughtered at a young age to produce veal. Cows produce milk until three weeks before birth. Over the last fifty years, dairy farming has become more intensive to increase the yield of milk produced by each cow. The Holstein-Friesian is the breed of dairy cow most common in the UK, Europe and the United States. It has been bred selectively to produce the highest yields of milk of any cow. The average in the UK is about 22 litres per day.

Dairy is a large industry worldwide. In 2023, the 27 European Union countries produced 143 million tons of cow's milk; the United States 104.1 million tons; and India 99.5 million tons. India further produces 94.4 million tons of buffalo milk, making it (in 2023) the world's largest milk producer; its dairy industry employs some 80 million people.

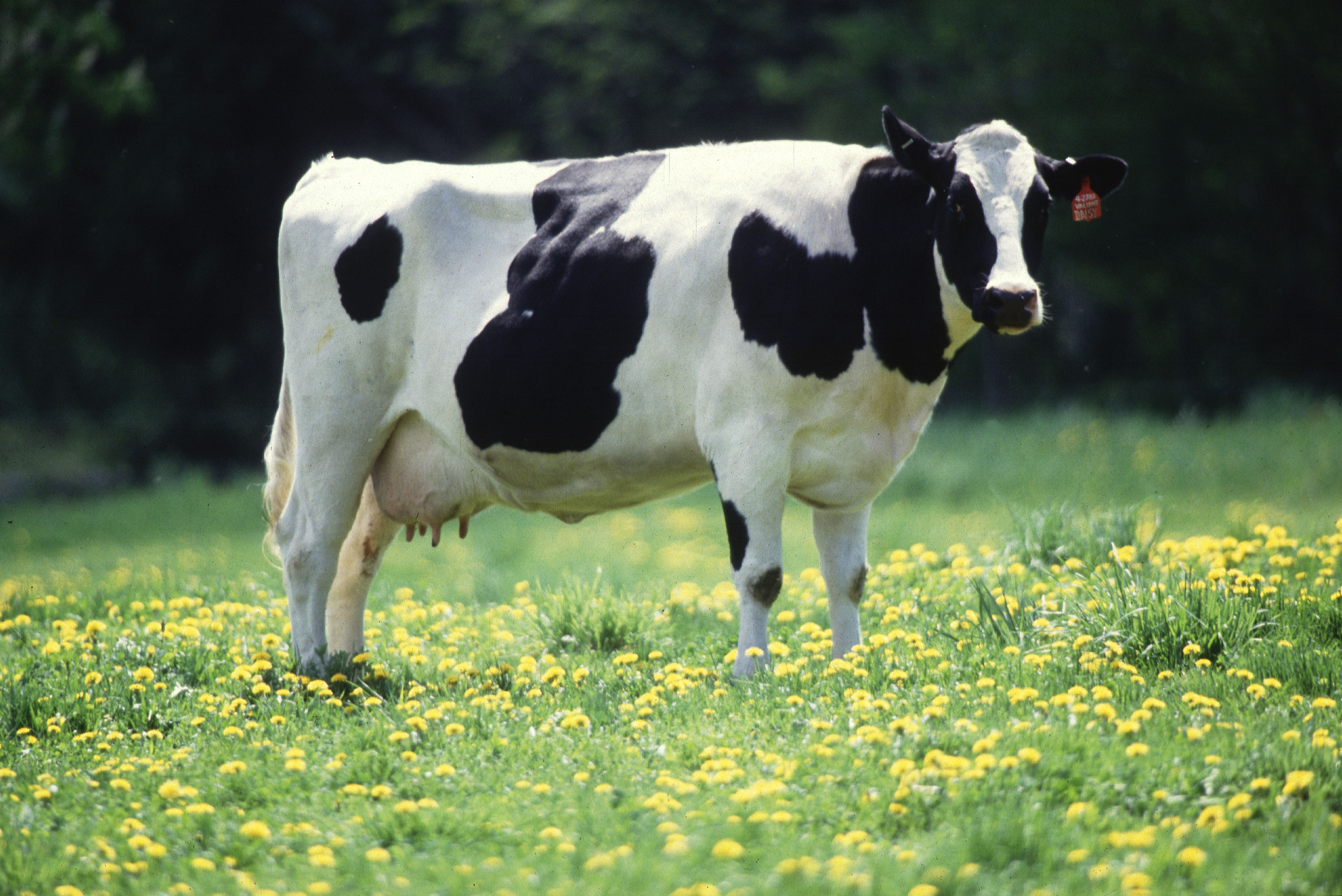
Holstein cattle are the primary dairy breed, bred for high milk production.

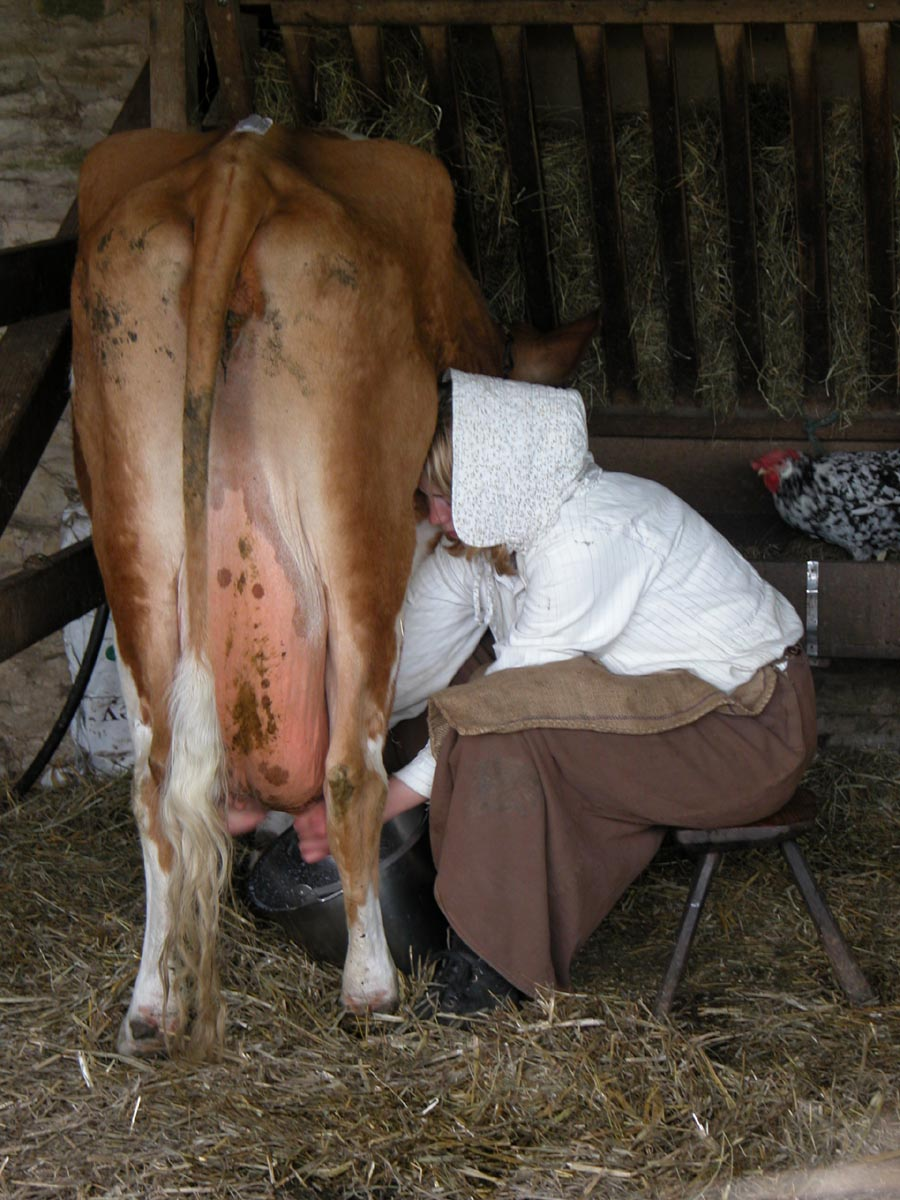
The milking of cattle was once largely by hand. Demonstration at Cogges Manor Farm, Oxfordshire

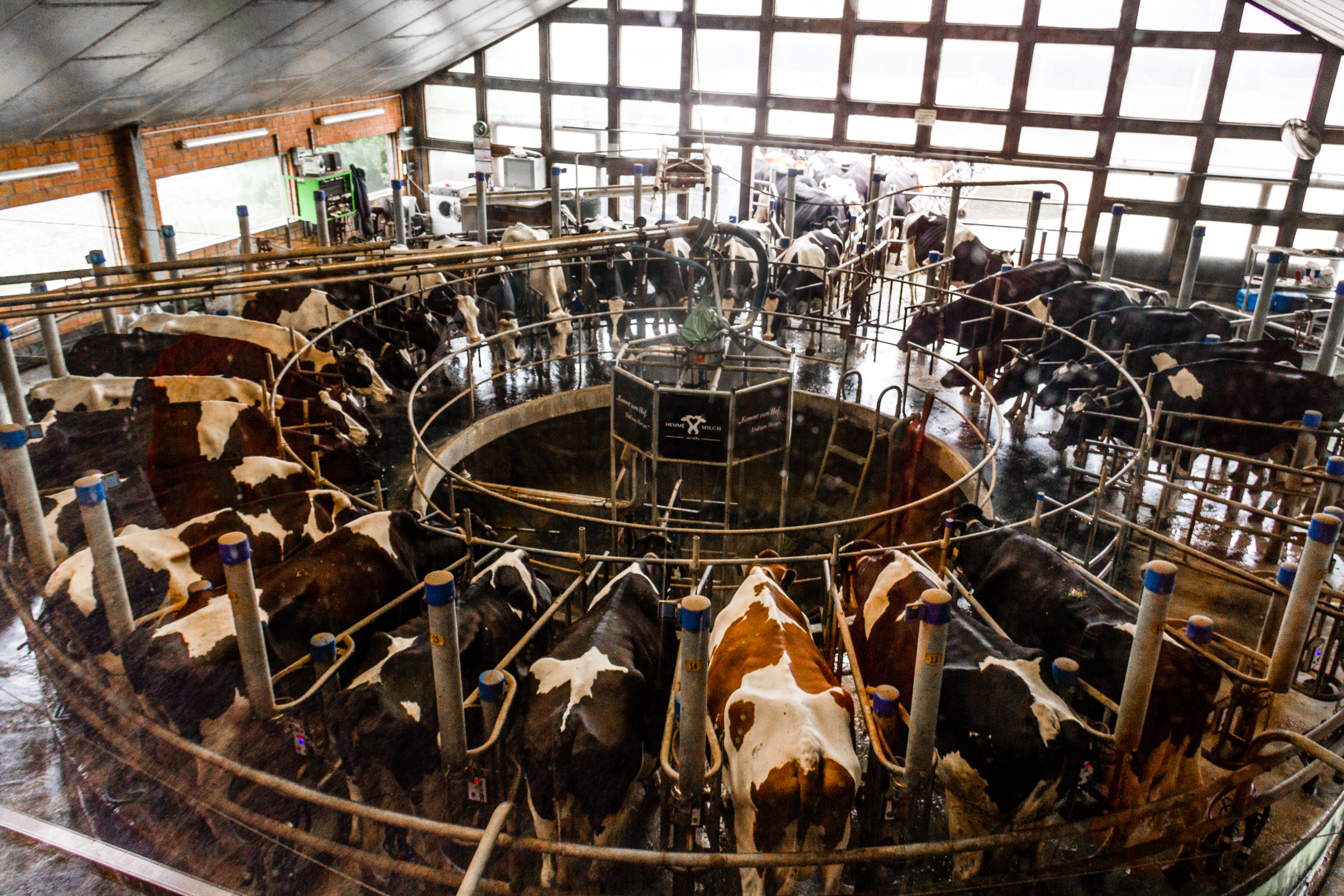
A modern rotary milking parlour, Germany
FAO data for 2021

World production of bovine milk (cow + buffalo)

=== Draft animals ===
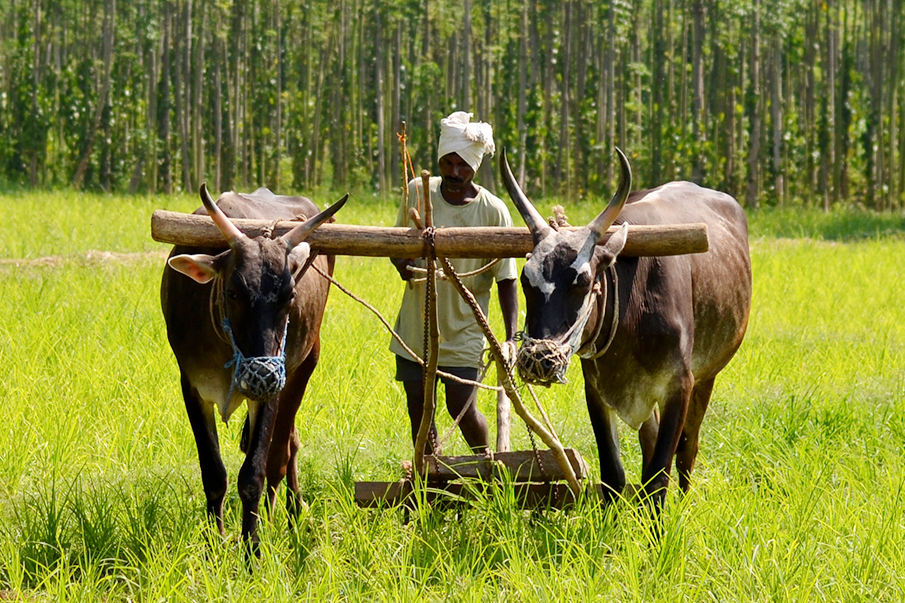
Oxen used in traditional ploughing – Karnataka

Oxen are cattle trained as draft animals. Oxen can pull heavier loads and for a longer period of time than horses. Oxen are used worldwide, especially in developing countries. There are some 11 million draft oxen in sub-Saharan Africa, while in 1998 India had over 65 million oxen. At the start of the 21st century, about half the world's crop production depended on land preparation by draft animals.

=== Hides ===
Cattle are not often kept solely for hides, and they are usually a by-product of beef production. Hides are used mainly for leather products such as shoes. In 2012, India was the world's largest producer of cattle hides. Cattle hides account for about 65% of the world's leather production.

== Health ==
=== Pests and diseases ===
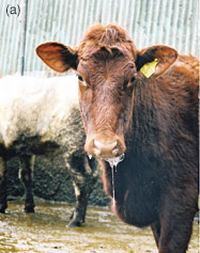
Drooling due to foot-and-mouth disease

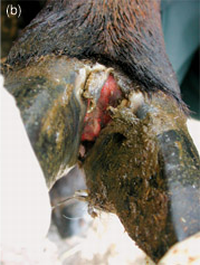
Infected hoof of the same heifer

Cattle are subject to pests including arthropod parasites such as ticks (which can in turn transmit diseases caused by bacteria and protozoa), and diseases caused by pathogens including bacteria and viruses. Some viral diseases are spread by insects—i.e. bluetongue disease is spread by midges. Psoroptic mange is a disabling skin condition caused by mites. Bovine tuberculosis is caused by a bacterium; it causes disease in humans and in wild animals such as deer and badgers. Foot-and-mouth disease is caused by a virus, affects a range of hoofed livestock and is highly contagious. Bovine spongiform encephalopathy is a neurodegenerative disease spread by a prion, a misfolded brain protein, in contaminated meat. Among the intestinal parasites of cattle are Paramphistomum flukes, affecting the rumen, and hookworms in the small intestine.

=== Role of climate change ===
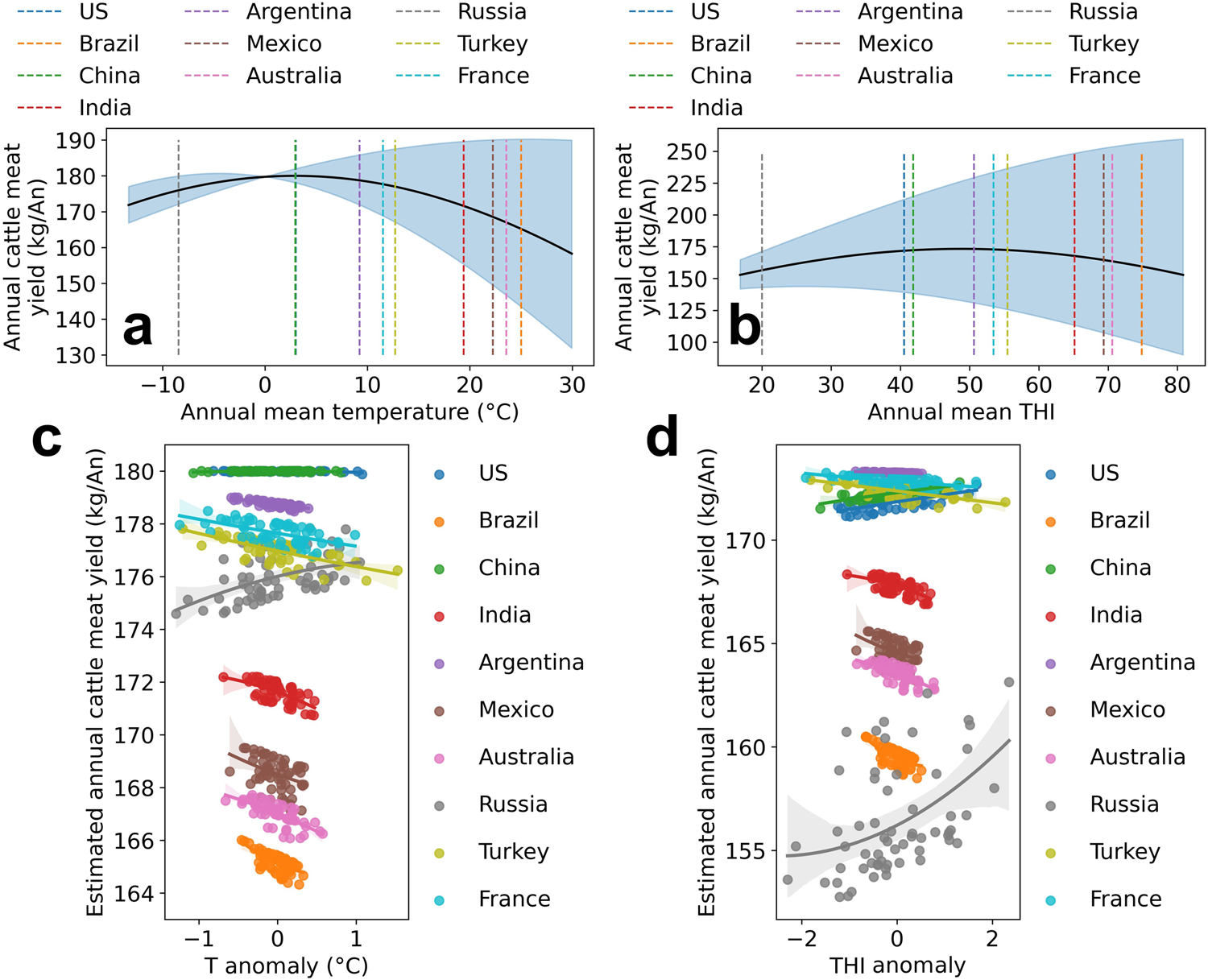
Most of the top 10 beef-producing countries are likely to see lower production with greater temperatures (left) and heat stress (right).

Climate change is expected to exacerbate heat stress in cattle, and for longer periods. Heat-stressed cattle may experience accelerated breakdown of adipose tissue by the liver, causing lipidosis. Cattle eat less when heat stressed, resulting in ruminal acidosis, which can lead to laminitis. Cattle can attempt to deal with higher temperatures by panting more often; this rapidly decreases carbon dioxide concentrations at the price of increasing pH, respiratory alkalosis. To deal with this, cattle are forced to shed bicarbonate through urination, at the expense of rumen buffering. These two pathologies can both cause lameness. Another specific risk is mastitis. This worsens as Calliphora blowflies increase in number with continued warming, spreading mastitis-causing bacteria. Ticks too are likely to increase in temperate zones as the climate warms, increasing the risk of tick-borne diseases. Both beef and milk production are likely to experience declines due to climate change.

== Impact of cattle husbandry ==
=== On public health ===
Cattle health is at once a veterinary issue (for animal welfare and productivity), a public health issue (to limit the spread of disease), and a food safety issue (to ensure meat and dairy products are safe to eat). These concerns are reflected in farming regulations. These rules can become political matters, as when it was proposed in the UK in 2011 that milk from tuberculosis-infected cattle should be allowed to enter the food chain. Cattle disease attracted attention in the 1980s and 1990s when bovine spongiform encephalopathy (mad cow disease) broke out in the United Kingdom. BSE can cross into humans as the deadly variant Creutzfeldt–Jakob disease; 178 people in the UK had died from it by 2010.

=== On the environment ===
Beef has the highest greenhouse gas impact of any agricultural commodity, followed by mutton.

The gut flora of cattle produce methane, a powerful greenhouse gas, as a byproduct of enteric fermentation, with each cow belching out 100kg a year. Additional methane is produced by anaerobic fermentation of stored manure. The FAO estimates that in 2015, about 7% of global greenhouse gas emissions were due to cattle farming. Reducing methane emissions quickly helps limit climate change.

Concentrated animal feeding operations in particular produce substantial amounts of wastewater and manure, which can cause environmental harms such as soil erosion, human and animal exposure to toxic chemicals, development of antibiotic resistant bacteria and an increase in E. coli contamination.

In many world regions, overgrazing by cattle has reduced biodiversity of the grazed plants and of animals at different trophic levels in the ecosystem. A well documented consequence of overgrazing is woody plant encroachment in rangelands, which significantly reduces the carrying capacity of the land over time.

=== On animal welfare ===
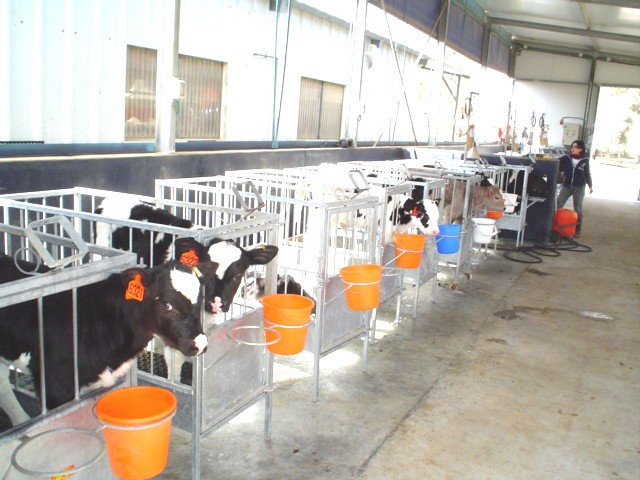
Confining calves for veal production in individual crates has attracted welfare concerns.

Cattle husbandry practices including branding, castration, dehorning, ear tagging, nose ringing, restraint, tail docking, the use of veal crates, and cattle prods have raised welfare concerns.

Stocking density is the number of animals within a specified area. High stocking density can affect cattle health, welfare, productivity, and feeding behaviour. Densely-stocked cattle feed more rapidly and lie down sooner, increasing the risk of teat infection, mastitis, and embryo loss. The stress and negative health impacts induced by high stocking density such as in concentrated animal feeding operations or feedlots, auctions, and transport may be detrimental to cattle welfare.

To produce milk, most calves are separated from their mothers soon after birth and fed milk replacement to retain the cows' milk for human consumption. Dairy cattle are frequently artificially inseminated. Animal welfare advocates are critical of this practice, stating that this breaks the natural bond between the mother and her calf. The welfare of veal calves is also a concern.

Two sports involving cattle are thought to be cruel by animal welfare groups: rodeos and bullfighting. Such groups oppose rodeo activities including bull riding, calf roping and steer roping, stating that rodeos are unnecessary and cause stress, injury, and death to the animals. In Spain, the Running of the bulls faces opposition due to the stress and injuries incurred by the bulls during the event.

== In culture ==
From early in civilisation, cattle have been used in barter. Cattle play a part in several religions. Veneration of the cow is a symbol of Hindu community identity. Slaughter of cows is forbidden by law in several states of the Indian Union, and in Nepal.

The ox is one of the 12-year cycle of animals which appear in the Chinese zodiac. The astrological sign Taurus is represented as a bull in the Western zodiac.

Cattle in culture

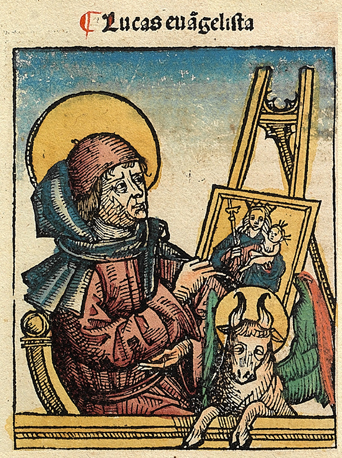
St Luke the evangelist depicted with a bull in the 1493 Nuremberg Chronicle

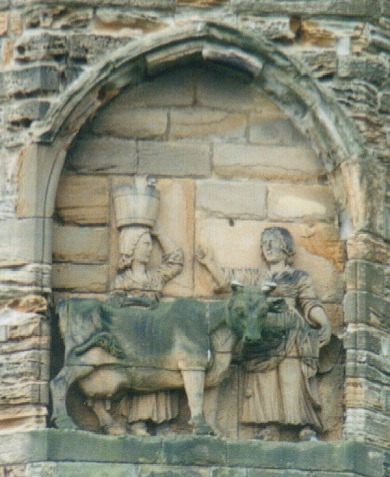
A legend claims that monks carrying the body of Saint Cuthbert were led by a milk maid who had lost her dun cow. They built Durham Cathedral where it was found.

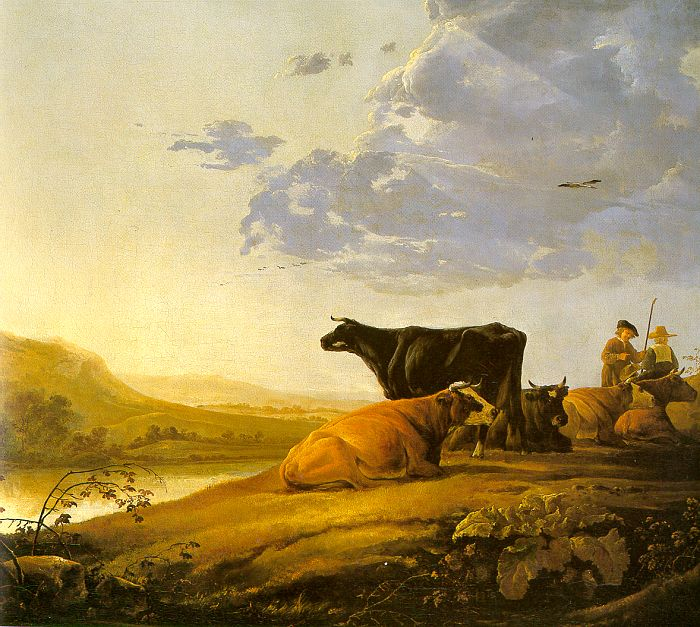
Dutch Golden Age painting: Young Herdsman with Cows by Aelbert Cuyp, 1655–60

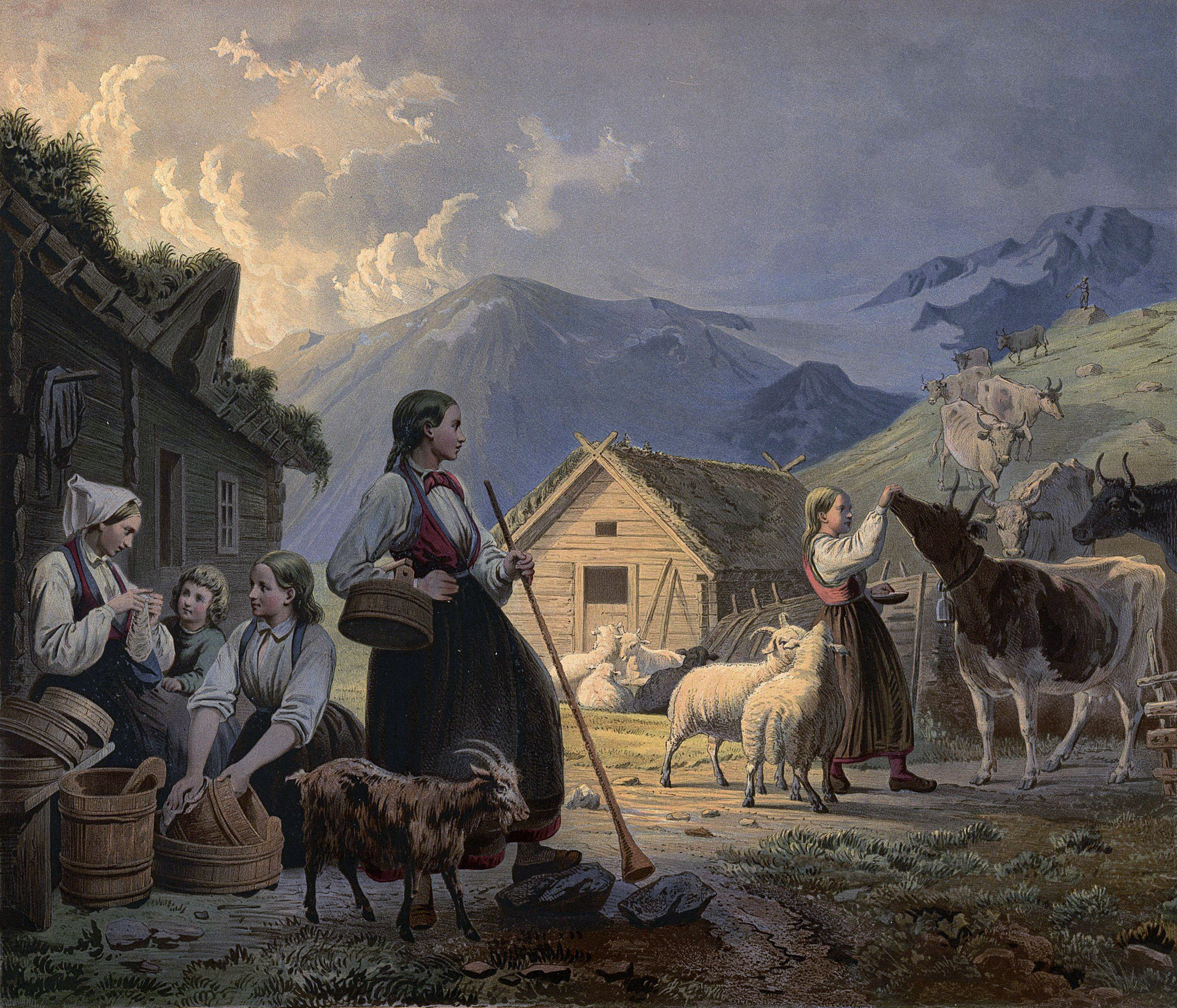
An Evening at the Hut of the Cow-Herdesses, Knud Bergslien, before 1858

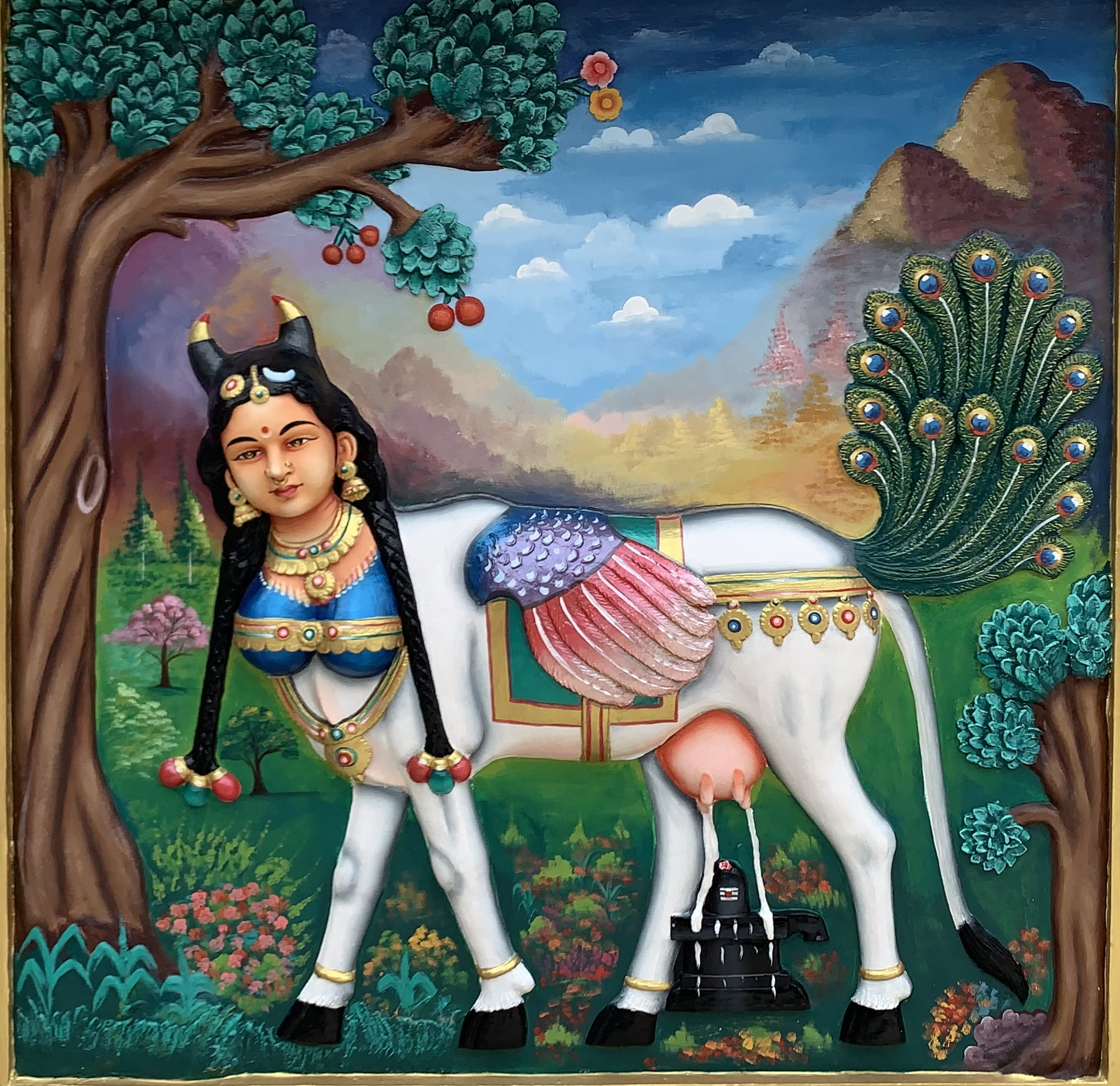
Kamadhenu, a Hindu cow goddess. Arulmigu Rajamariamman Temple, Johor Bahru, Malaysia

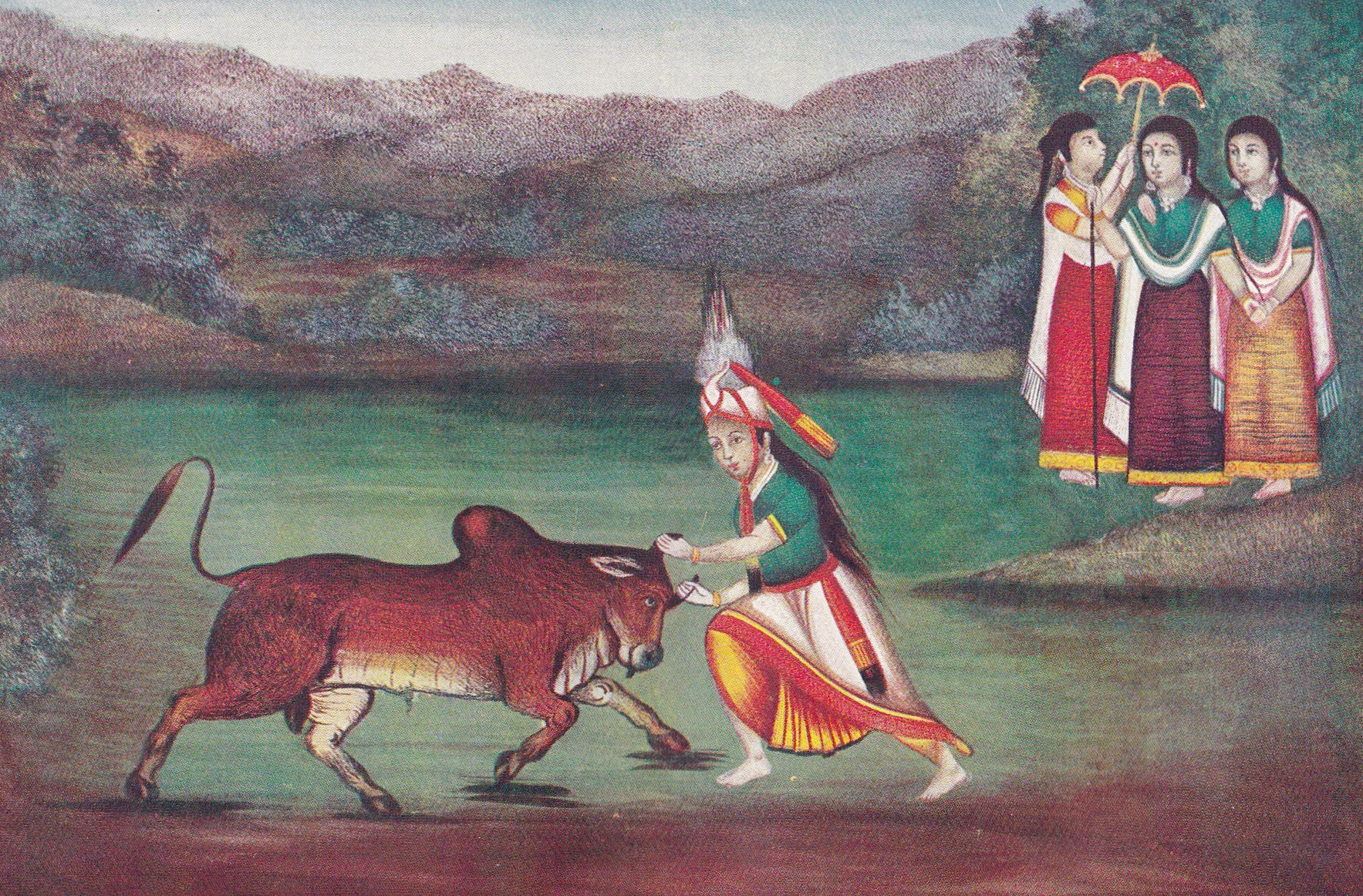
The hero of Meitei mythology, Khuman Khamba, capturing the bull Kao

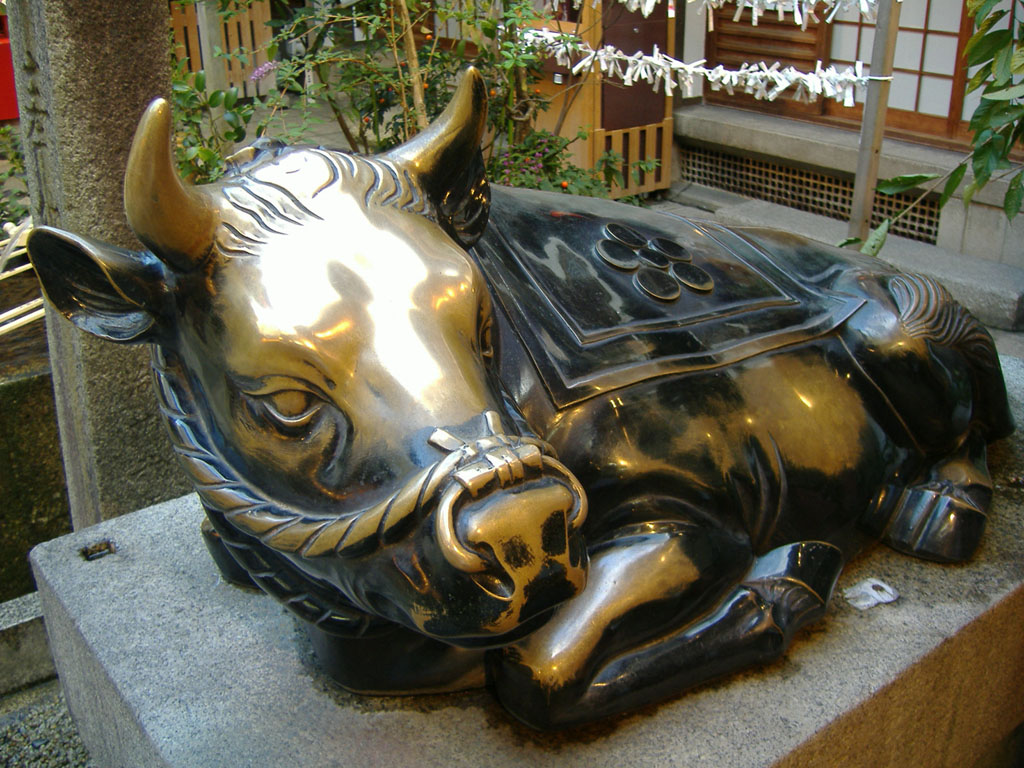
The God-bull Shingyu, Kyoto, Japan

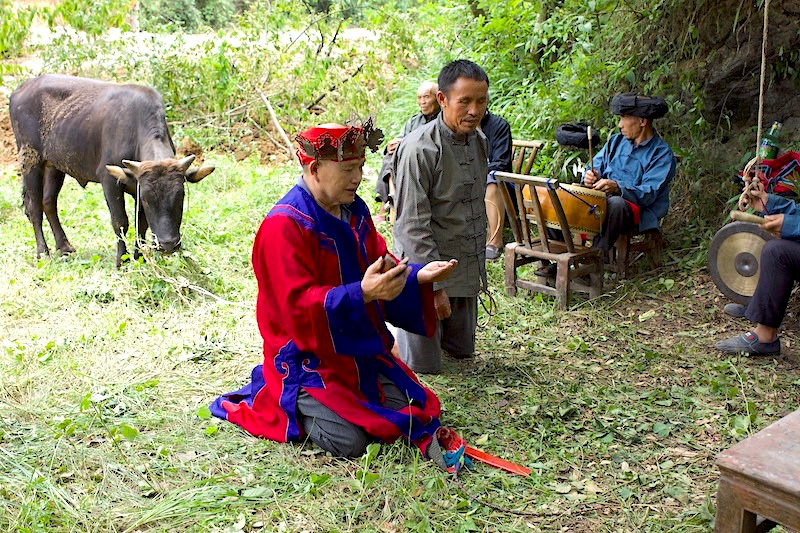
Cattle sacrifice ceremony in Miao folk religion, Hunan, China

== See also ==
- List of individual bovines
- British Cattle Health Initiative
- Bull-baiting
- Bullocky
- Bulls and cows (game)
- Cattle age determination
- Cowboy
- List of cattle breeds
