= Bovine genome database =

Integrated database

Bovine Genome Database

Content
- Description: integrated tools for genome annotation
- Organisms: Cattle

Contact
- Research center: Georgetown University
- Primary citation: PMID 21123190

Access
- Website: http://BovineGenome.org

The Bovine Genome Database is an integrated database for the bovine genome.

== See also ==
- Bovine genome
