= Bovine genome =

Genome of a female Hereford cow

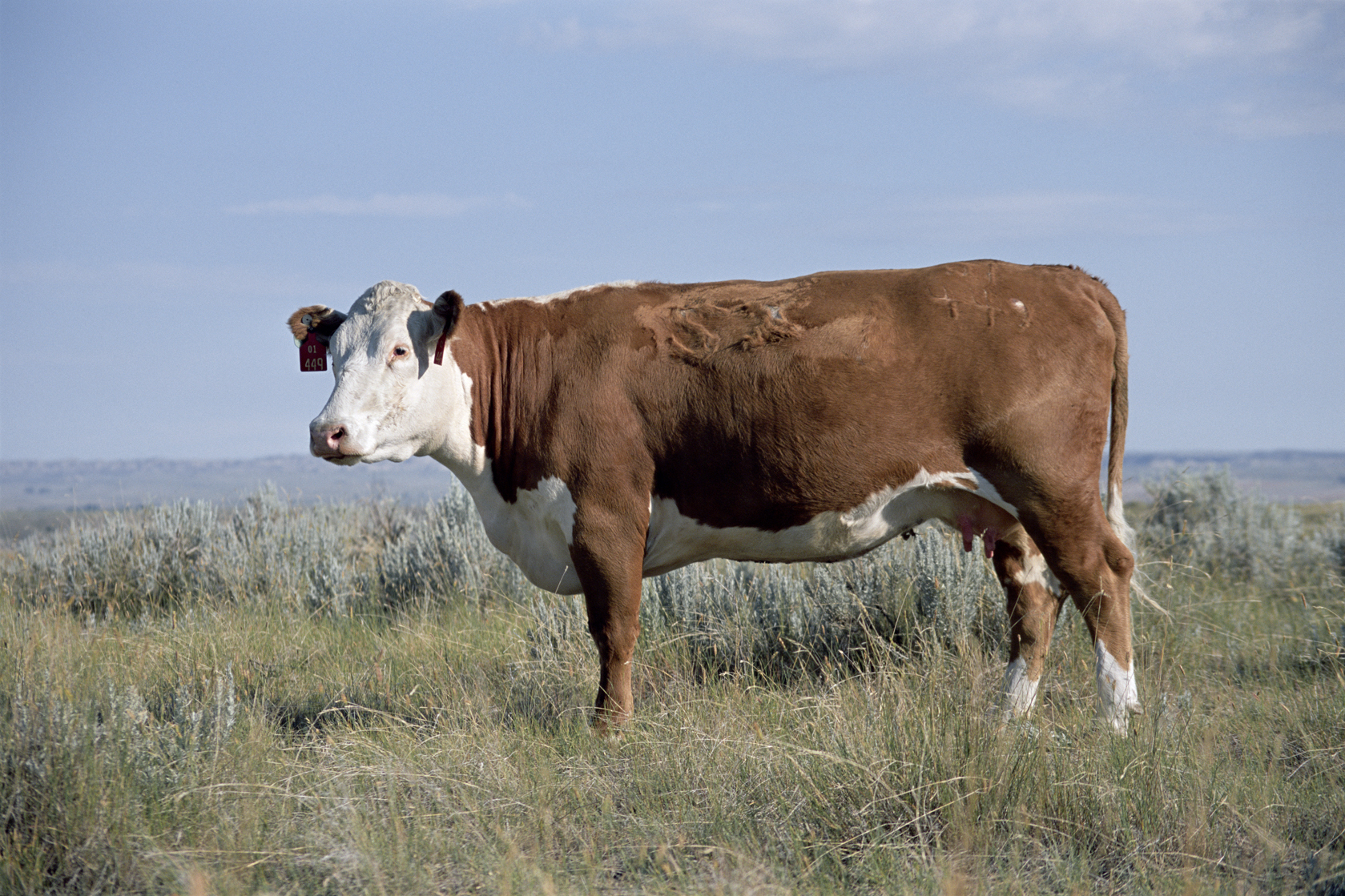
L1 Dominette 01449, the Hereford who serves as the subject of the Bovine Genome Project

The genome of a female Hereford cow was published in 2009. It was sequenced by the Bovine Genome Sequencing and Analysis Consortium, a team of researchers led by the National Institutes of Health and the U.S. Department of Agriculture. It was part of an effort to improve livestock breeding and at the time was one of the largest genomes ever sequenced.

== Genome ==
The size of the bovine genome is 2.7 Gb (2.7 billion base pairs). It contains approximately 35,092 genes of which 14,000 are common to all mammalian species. Bovines share 80 percent of their genes with humans; cows are less similar to humans than rodents (humans and rodents belong to the clade of Supraprimates) and dogs (humans and dogs belong to the clade of Boreoeutheria). They also have about 1,000 genes shared with dogs and rodents but not identified in humans.

The charting of key DNA differences, also known as haplotypes, between several varieties of cattle could allow scientists to understand what is the role of some genes coding for products of economic value (milk, meat, leather). It opens new perspectives for enhancing selective breeding and changing certain cattle characteristics for the benefit of farmers.

== Team ==
The Bovine Genome Sequencing and Analysis Consortium worked to sequence the genome over a six-year period, and included 300 scientists across 25 countries led by the U.S. NIH and the USDA.

== See also ==
- Cattle
  - Hereford cattle
- DNA
- Genome
  - International HapMap Project
  - List of sequenced eukaryotic genomes
  - Composite SINE transposons in the bovine genome
  - Bovine genome database
