= Aleutian wild cattle =

Breed of cattle

Aleutian wild cattle are feral wild cattle found on the Alaskan Aleutian Islands. Several attempts have been made to round up these cattle for ranching. From 1985 to 1986, the cattle on the Shumagin Islands were eliminated by the U.S. Fish and Wildlife Service, but they still remain on Umnak Island and Chirikof Island. As of 2023, there were approximately 2,000 cattle on Chirikof Island. Their origins are not known; genetic testing shows them to be genetically distinct from common American commercial breeds, though related to Highland cattle.
