= Animal treatment in rodeo =

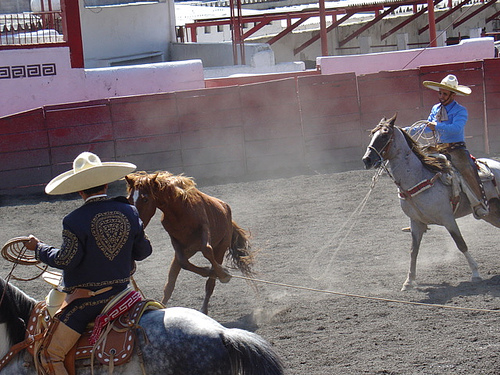
Horse tripping is a controversial charreada event banned in nine US states.

The welfare of animals in rodeo has been a topic of discussion for the industry, the public, and the law for decades.

== Laws ==
In response to animal welfare and animal cruelty concerns, a number of laws have passed regulating rodeo. In the United Kingdom the Protection of Animals Act 1934 effectively made rodeo, as it was then practiced, illegal in England, Scotland and Wales. In September 2000, California became the first American state to prohibit the use of prods on any animal in a chute.

== Independent assessments ==
Modern rodeos in the United States are closely regulated and have responded to accusations of animal cruelty by instituting a number of rules to guide how rodeo animals are to be managed.

In 1994, a survey of 28 sanctioned rodeos was conducted by on-site independent veterinarians. Reviewing animal runs, the injury rate was documented at 0.047% (16 animals in 33,991 runs).

In 2000, a survey conducted by independent veterinarians at 57 Professional Rodeo Cowboys Association (PRCA) rodeos found an injury rate of 0.053% (38 animal injuries in 71,743 animal exposures).

A 2001 survey reported an injury rate of 0.056% in 21 PRCA rodeos (15 animals in 26,584 performances).

A later PRCA survey of 60,971 animal performances at 198 rodeo performances and 73 sections of "slack" (competitions outside of the main competition events) indicated 27 animals were injured, i.e. 0.04%.

In Australian rodeos, similar injury rates occur. Basic injuries occur at a rate of 0.072% (one in 1,405), with injuries requiring veterinary attention at 0.036% (one injury each 2,810 times an animal is used in competition).

Accusations of cruelty in U.S. rodeos persist. The PRCA acknowledges they sanction only about 30% of all rodeos, another 50% are sanctioned by other organizations and 20% are completely unsanctioned. Several animal rights and animal welfare organizations keep records of accidents and incidents of possible animal abuse. They cite various specific incidents of injury to support their statements, and also point to examples of long-term breakdown, as well as reporting on injuries and deaths suffered by animals in non-rodeo events staged on the periphery of professional rodeo such as chuck wagon races and "suicide races." In terms of statistics on animal injury rate during rodeos, there appear to be no independent studies more recent than the 1994 study.

Groups such as People for the Ethical Treatment of Animals (PETA) note incidents of animal injury, including an incident where a "bull [sic] suffered from a broken neck ..." According to the American Society for the Prevention of Cruelty to Animals (ASPCA), practice sessions are often the scene of more severe animal welfare abuses than competitions.

== Positions of animal welfare groups ==
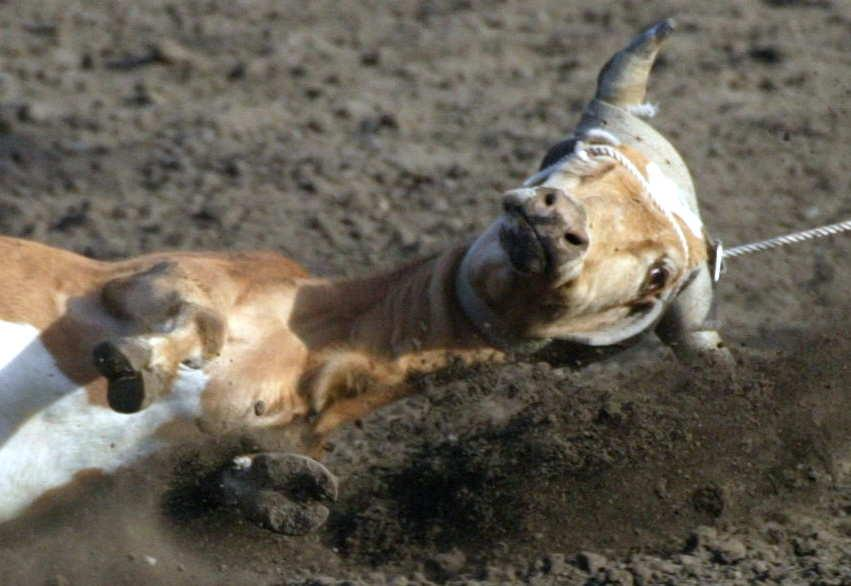
A steer after being roped.

The Calgary Humane Society "opposes the use of animals for any form of entertainment in which they are placed at risk of suffering undue stress, pain, injury or death," and "opposes high risk rodeo events."

Vancouver Humane Society is "opposed to rodeo because most rodeo events involve the use of fear, stress or pain to make animals perform. There is also considerable risk of injury or death for the animals." In Canada, the City of Vancouver and the District of North Vancouver have banned rodeos.

RSPCA Australia is "opposed to rodeos and rodeo schools because of the potential for significant injury, suffering or distress to the animals involved. The use of painful devices such as flank straps, spurs and electric prods contributes to suffering associated with this sport."

== See also ==
- Animal welfare in the United States
