= ParameciumDB =

Content
- Description: Paramecium tetraurelia genome sequence
- Organisms: Paramecium

Contact
- Research center: CNRS
- Laboratory: Centre de Génétique Moléculaire, Gif-sur-Yvette, France.
- Authors: Olivier Arnaiz
- Primary citation: Arnaiz & al. (2007)
- Release date: 2006

Access
- Website: https://paramecium.i2bc.paris-saclay.fr/

ParameciumDB is a database for the genome and biology of the ciliate Paramecium tetraurelia.

== See also ==
- Paramecium
