= GeneDB =

Database for pathogen genomes

Content
- Description: an annotation database for pathogens.

Contact
- Authors: Flora J Logan-Klumpler
- Primary citation: Logan-Klumpler & al. (2012)
- Release date: 2011

Access
- Website: http://www.genedb.org

GeneDB was a genome database for eukaryotic and prokaryotic pathogens.
