= Disease vector =

Agent that carries and transmits pathogens

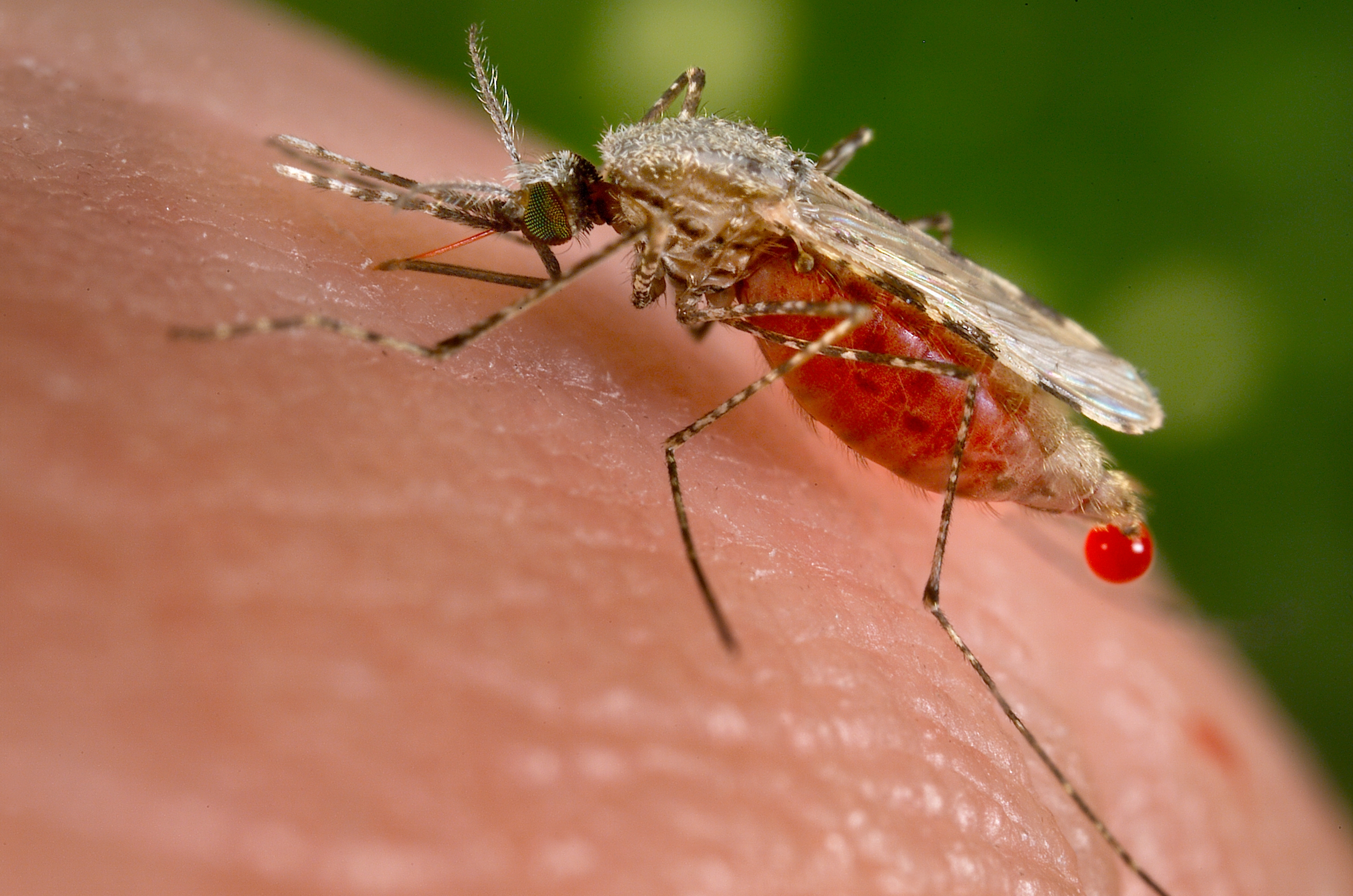
A mosquito shortly after obtaining blood from a human (note the droplet of blood plasma being expelled as the mosquito squeezes out excess water). Mosquitos are a vector for several diseases, including viral malaria.

In epidemiology, a disease vector is any living agent that carries and transmits an infectious pathogen such as a parasite or microbe, to another living organism. Many familiar vectors, such as mosquitos, ticks, and certain flies rely on blood-feeding and can acquire or pass on pathogens during that process. Disease vectors remain a major global health challenge. The World Health Organization reports that these illnesses make up over 17% of all infectious diseases worldwide, and are responsible for hundreds of thousands of deaths every year. The term is also used for some insects and other organisms that transmit plant pathogens to crops.

Agents regarded as vectors are mostly blood-sucking (hematophagous) arthropods such as mosquitoes. The first major discovery of a disease vector came from Ronald Ross in 1897, who discovered the malaria pathogen when he dissected the stomach tissue of a mosquito. The process of proving that a vector is responsible for transmitting pathogens is called vector incrimination. Transmission depends on interactions among a host, a pathogen, and a vector species that is capable of carrying the infection. Some pathogens may multiply or undergo part of their life cycle inside of the vector, while others are transferred from one surface to another without developing inside the carrier.

Shifts in climate, expanding cities, and land-use changes are reshaping where vectors can survive. Warmer temperatures and altered rainfall patterns can boost mosquito and tick populations, which can extend their breeding seasons and geographic reach. Urban green spaces and infrastructure may potentially create new breeding grounds for vectors such as mosquitos, thus bringing them closer to dense human populations. Additionally, international trade and human movement can rapidly transport vectors and pathogens across continents, which may introduce them to naive populations. Naive populations refer to a set of participants who have not previously encountered or been exposed to a particular substance, treatment, or condition, and therefore have no built-up immunity or prior experience with it.

Due to these shifting conditions, public health agencies are encouraging broad and coordinated approaches to reducing vector-borne diseases. Strategies implemented include monitoring vector populations, improving environmental management, increasing community participation, and adopting newer tools and technologies where appropriate.

== Arthropods ==
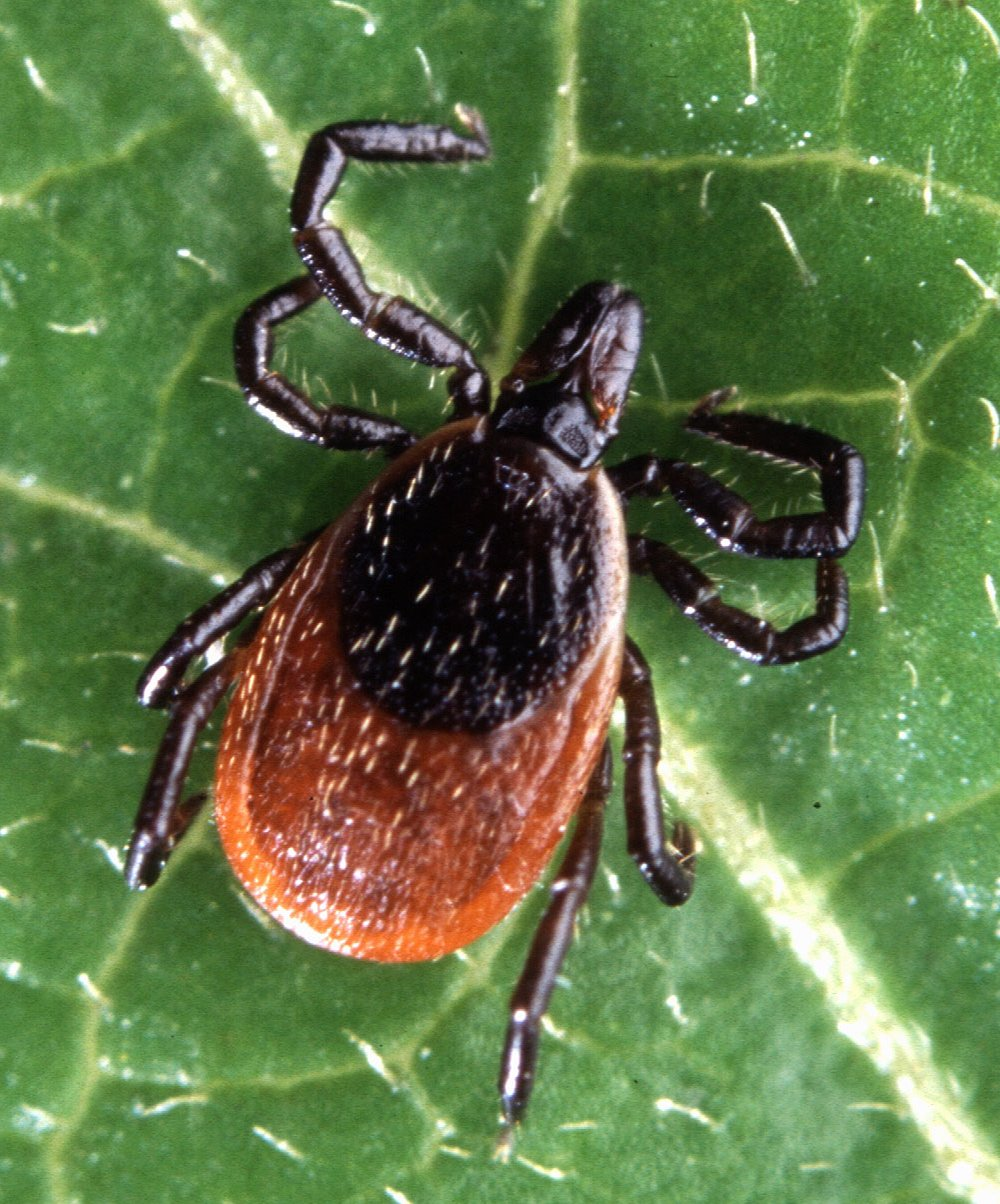
The deer tick, a vector for Lyme disease pathogens

Arthropods, including mosquitoes, ticks, biting midges, blackflies, sandflies, tsetse flies, triatome bugs, lice, fleas, and thrips, form a major group of pathogen vectors, transmitting a huge number of pathogens. Many such vectors are haematophagous, meaning they feed on blood at some or all stages of their lives. When the insects and ticks feed on blood, the pathogen enters the blood stream of the host. These pathogens replicate within the vector and the vector is often a carrier for the rest of its life. The pathogen is spread to new hosts from the vector during subsequent blood meals.

When a mosquito takes a blood meal from a human or animal, a pathogen from that host can pass from the gut of the mosquito into the mosquito's body, if that pathogen is able to grow within a mosquito. There, the pathogen multiplies and eventually moves to the salivary glands of the mosquito. When the mosquito next takes a blood meal from a human or animal, the pathogen is transferred from the mosquito's salivary gland to the new host.

Different mosquito genera act as vectors for different diseases. The Anopheles mosquito transmits malaria, lymphatic filariasis, and O'nyong'nyong virus. Malaria is caused by Plasmodium parasites, and lymphatic filariasis is caused by the filarial nematodes Wuchereria bancrofti, Brugia malayi, and Brugia timori.

The Aedes mosquito transmits chikungunya, dengue, lymphatic filariasis, Rift Valley fever, yellow fever, and Zika. The chikungunya virus is related to the O'nyong'nyong virus that is carried by Anopheles mosquitoes, with both viruses being in the Alphavirus genus. Dengue, Rift Valley fever, yellow fever, and Zika are all caused by viruses.

Although Aedes mosquitoes are able to carry the oropouche virus and play a role in the spread of the virus in wild animals such as three-toed sloths, primates, and birds, the disease is mainly spread between humans in urban environments by biting midges, specifically Culicoides paraensi. These biting midges are much smaller than mosquitoes, but their bites are often more painful. Culex quinquefasciatus may also play a role in spreading Oropouche virus between humans in urban settings, however, biting midges are the main vector.

Culex mosquitoes act as vectors for Japanese encephalitis, lymphatic filariasis, and West Nile fever. Japanese encephalitis and West Nile fever are both caused by viruses.

Ticks are known to carry over one hundred different pathogens, including viruses, bacteria, protozoans, and parasites. These pathogens are found in Europe, Asia, and North America. Ticks act as vectors for diseases such as Lyme disease, tick-borne encephalitis, Crimean-Congo hemorrhagic fever, relapsing fever (also called borreliosis), rickettsial diseases such as spotted fever, and tularemia. Lyme disease, relapsing fever, rickettsial diseases, and tularaemia are caused by bacteria. Lyme disease is caused by the bacteria Borrelia burgdorferi, while relapsing fever is caused by several different species of Borrelia bacteria. Rickettsial diseases come from bacteria within the order Rickettsiales and tularemia is caused by the bacteria Francisella tularensis. Two of the viruses carried by ticks are tick-borne encephalitis virus and Crimean-Congo hemorrhagic fever virus.

Blackflies, also known as Simulium rasyani, are the vector for onchocerciasis (also called river blindness), which is caused by the nematode Onchocerca volvulus. The blackfly carries O. volvulus when it takes a blood meal from an infected human and ingests microfilariae. These microfilariae move to the blackfly's midgut and then thoracic muscles, where they can develop into larvae and, later, infective larvae. These infective larvae then move to the proboscis of the blackfly. From there, the infective larvae are able to spread to a new host the next time the blackfly takes a blood meal.

Sandflies are vectors for leishmaniasis and sandfly fever (also called phlebotomus fever). Leishmaniasis is caused by parasites of the genus Leishmania, while sandfly fever is caused by viruses in the genus Phlebovirus.

Both sleeping sickness (also called African trypanosomiasis) and Chagas disease (also called American trypanosomiasis) are trypanosomatid diseases, caused by the protozoan parasites Trypanosoma brucei and Trypanosoma cruzi, respectively. However, these two diseases are spread through different vectors. Tsetse flies act as the vector for sleeping sickness, while triatome bugs spread Chagas disease. In the case of Chagas disease, triatome bugs defecate during feeding and the excrement contains the parasites, which is accidentally smeared into the open wound, eyes, or mouth by the host.

The body louse Pediculus humanus acts as a vector for the bacteria Rickettsia prowazekii, which causes epidemic typhus, and Rickettsia typhi, which causes murine typhus. The same species of louse also spreads the bacteria Borrelia recurrentis, which is the causative agent of louse-borne relapsing fever.

Plague, caused by the bacteria Yersinia pestis, is spread between humans and small mammals by infected fleas.

There are several species of Thrips that act as vectors for over 20 viruses, especially Tospoviruses, and cause all sorts of plant diseases.

Arthropods have also been implicated in spreading antibiotic-resistant bacterial pathogens around health care environments such as hospitals. Cockroaches, flies, and ants have all been implicated in carrying Klebsiella pneumoniae, Enterobacter cloacae, Staphylococcus aureus, Enterococcus faecalis, Acinetobacter baumannii, and Pseudomonas aeruginosa.

== Molluscs ==
Freshwater snails act as vectors for trematode worms of the genus Schistosoma, which cause schistosomiasis. These snails release the larval form of these worms into water, which are then able to penetrate the skin of humans that have contact with this water. These larvae develop into adult schistosomes in the human host and then release eggs, which can be released back into water through urine and feces, thus continuing the life cycle.

== Plants and fungi ==
Some insects, plants and fungi act as vectors by transmitting pathogens between susceptible hosts. Sap-sucking insects, notably in the Hemiptera, may act as vectors of plant pathogens as well as being crop pests due to feeding. Insect, fungal and plant vectors can influence disease cycles in many agricultural systems by carrying plant viruses that spread through soil, roots, or direct plant contact. These vectors can not be considered passive carriers, since many of them have life cycles that align closely with host plant growth. Their transmission patterns often follow root development, nutrient flow, and plant age, which strengthens their ability to maintain pathogens within a cropping system. For example, the big-vein disease of lettuce was long thought to be caused by a member of the fungal division Chytridiomycota, namely Olpidium brassicae. Eventually, however, the disease was shown to be viral. Later it transpired that the virus was transmitted by the zoospores of the fungus and also survived in the resting spores. Since then, many other fungi in Chytridiomycota have been shown to vector plant viruses.

Several soil dwelling fungi transmit plant viruses through motile spores and long lived resting structures. Species of Olpidium are important fungal vectors, and Olpidium brassicae produces zoospores that attach to plant roots and release virus particles into the host during infection. These zoospores often locate host roots by following chemical gradients in the soil, which increases their efficiency as vectors. Other fungal vectors include Polymyxa species. Polymyxa graminis is an obligate parasite, and it can transmit viruses such as barley yellow mosaic virus and soil borne wheat mosaic virus. These fungi can survive for extended periods in soil, which supports ongoing transmission cycles in grain producing regions. Because Polymyxa depends completely on living host tissue, its presence in soils ensures that cereal viruses remain active year after year and can re-infect crops even after rotations.

Many plant pests that seriously damage important crops depend on other plants, often weeds, to harbour or vector them; the distinction is not always clear. In the case of Puccinia graminis for example, Berberis and related genera act as alternate hosts in a cycle of infection of grain. Sexual reproduction on Berberis shrubs generates new genetic combinations in the pathogen, and this process can create rust races capable of overcoming wheat resistance genes. This sexual stage was historically so important that large scale programs removed millions of Berberis shrubs in order to reduce stem rust epidemics in wheat growing regions. The ability of Puccinia graminis to recombine genetically on Berberis increases the diversity of spores released into surrounding environments and contributes to frequent shifts in virulence patterns. This relationship shows how non crop plants can play essential roles in disease epidemiology and pathogen evolution.

More directly, when they twine from one plant to another, parasitic plants such as Cuscuta and Cassytha have been shown to convey phytoplasmal and viral diseases between plants. Some parasitic flowering plants also act as vectors for plant pathogens. Cuscuta species form haustoria that connect their vascular systems to those of multiple host plants, and these connections allow movement of viruses and phytoplasmas through shared tissues. Because a single dodder vine can attach to multiple hosts, it can contribute to rapid pathogen spread in natural and agricultural environments. The haustoria of Cuscuta forms by penetrating host cortex tissue and establishing direct phloem level continuity with the host vascular system. This structure allows not only viruses but also proteins, metabolites, and other macromolecules to move between connected plants. Dodder is frequently used in research as a tool for experimentally transmitting viruses between plant species because it bypasses natural host resistance barriers and enables direct phloem to phloem movement.

== Mammals ==
Mammals are not typically considered biological vectors in the same way that mosquitos or ticks are, but they play important roles in the ecology and transmission of infectious diseases. In most cases, mammals function as reservoir hosts, wherein they maintain a pathogen in nature and enable its spread to humans or other animals. A reservoir host serves as a storage or source of the pathogen, whereas a vector acts as the vehicle that carries and spreads it, with many different organisms capable of being vectors. Transmission usually occurs through bites, scratches, or contact with infectious saliva and tissue rather than through a developmental stage within the mammal itself.

A well-known example is rabies. Rabies is a viral infection spread that is transmitted through exposure to the saliva or brain tissue of an infected animal. The saliva of the infected animal enters a wound or mucous membrane. Any warm-blooded animal can carry rabies, but the most common vectors are dogs, skunks, raccoons, and bats. Domestic dogs remain the main cause of human rabies deaths in parts of Africa and Asia.

Mammals also shape the risk of vector-borne diseases by providing blood meals for arthropods that transmit pathogens. Rodents and certain small mammals serve as important hosts for black-legged ticks, which can carry the bacteria that cause Lyme Disease. When populations of these animals rise or move into different or new environments, the number of infected ticks can grow as well, increasing the likelihood of human exposure.

Some mammals maintain viruses that have the potential to spill over into human populations when environmental, ecological, or behavioral conditions change, which makes them important reservoirs of zoonotic disease. Bats and rodents harbor a variety of zoonotic viruses. Although bats carry more zoonotic viruses per species, the total number of zoonotic viruses detected in bats is still lower than in rodents, largely because there are nearly twice as many rodent species as bat species. Thus, rodents remain a significant concern as reservoirs for viruses with the potential to emerge in humans, especially if ecological conditions shift or human contact with them increases.

The concept of mammals as mechanical vectors also appears in plant pathology. Humans can unintentionally transfer plant viruses, one such being Tobacco Mosaic Virus. This virus is a well-known plant virus that causes mosaic-style leaf molting, distortion, and stunted growth in many hosts, including tobacco, tomatoes, and peppers. It consists of a rod-shaped particle made of RNA and protein, and it is extremely stable. This allows it to persist for long periods of time in plant debris and on contaminated surfaces. It can be transferred through contaminated hands, clothing, or tools. In this case, humans act as passive carriers that move viral particles between plants.

== Vector-borne zoonotic disease and human activity ==
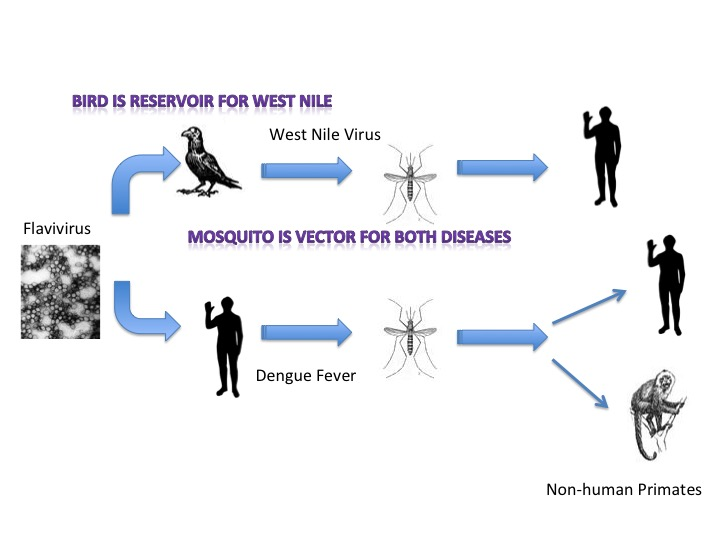
This figure shows how the Flavivirus is carried by mosquitos in the West Nile virus and Dengue fever. The mosquito would be considered a disease vector.

Rapid changes in land use, trade globalization, climate change and "social upheaval" are causing a resurgence in zoonotic disease across the world. Human driven environmental change continues to influence the ecology and distribution of many vector-borne zoonotic diseases. Modern patterns of deforestation, agricultural expansion, urbanization and global travel have increased contact between humans, wildlife reservoirs and disease vectors, which expands opportunities for pathogen transmission. These forms of land alteration create new habitats that support mosquitoes, ticks and other arthropods, and they can increase the likelihood of pathogen spillover into human populations. Displacement due to conflicts, migration, or population movements can create situations where people are more exposed to disease vectors. Additionally, human activities such as deforestation, agricultural expansion, urbanization, and increased trade and travel, are creating environments where vectors can thrive and spread diseases to humans more easily.

Large scale changes in land use are strongly associated with the emergence of vector-borne infections. Forest clearing and habitat fragmentation allow generalist vectors such as Aedes mosquitoes to expand into newly disturbed landscapes, which can increase the transmission of Zika. Agricultural intensification, including irrigation and livestock expansion, can produce warm and humid microhabitats where mosquitoes and ticks survive more readily, and these conditions support persistent transmission cycles. Urban growth can also create breeding sites in areas with standing water, which strengthens the establishment of invasive mosquito species such as Aedes albopictus.

Climate change further intensifies these patterns by altering temperature, humidity and precipitation conditions in ways that influence vector survival. Warmer temperatures allow ticks associated with Lyme disease to expand northward and remain active for longer seasons, which increases human exposure. Similar climate driven changes have been observed for mosquito vectors of West Nile virus, which spread into new regions as warming increases the number of suitable breeding sites and extends mosquito activity periods. These climate related shifts increase opportunities for both endemic and emerging zoonotic diseases to establish themselves in previously unaffected areas. Rising temperatures due to climate change create more favorable conditions for mosquitoes to expand their ranges and increase their populations. This can lead to higher rates of disease transmission in areas where these diseases were previously uncommon or nonexistent and the emergence of new diseases.

Globalization further enhances the mobility of both vectors and pathogens. Increased air travel and shipping can move mosquitoes and ticks between continents, and this movement can introduce new vector species into regions where they did not previously occur. The geographic spread of West Nile virus in North America has been closely linked to patterns of human transport, trade and urbanization, which enabled infected birds and mosquito vectors to disperse widely. These global networks can not only disperse vectors but also accelerate the speed at which zoonotic pathogens establish new transmission cycles.

More in-depth examples of vector-borne zoonotic diseases include:

- Lyme disease: Caused by the bacterium Borrelia burgdorferi, it is transmitted to humans by infected black-legged ticks, often found in wooded or grassy areas.
- Plague: Caused by the bacterium Yersinia pestis, it is primarily transmitted by fleas that infest rodents. The disease has had significant historical impacts, including the Black Death.
- West Nile virus: Transmitted by mosquitoes, it causes symptoms ranging from mild flu-like illness to severe neurological diseases, including encephalitis.

Human activity has shaped the modern distribution of these diseases. The northward expansion of ticks carrying Lyme disease corresponds to warming temperatures and changes in forest management practices that allow deer populations to grow and move into suburban areas. The spread of West Nile virus across the United States involved a combination of urbanization, altered land cover and the movement of infected birds into cities with abundant mosquito breeding sites. The transmission of Zika in the Americas was influenced by global travel, which allowed infected travelers to introduce the virus into regions containing highly competent Aedes vectors.

As an additional example of human involvement in transmission processes, some pathogens can be spread mechanically by humans. Humans can act as mechanical vectors for some diseases, such as Tobacco mosaic virus. TMV is a single-stranded RNA virus spread through physical contact. Humans physically transmit the virus with their hands or tools from plant to plant. The concept of humans acting as a vector for TMV requires understanding the transmission dynamics and how human activity can play a role in spreading the virus among plants. Humans do not usually act as primary vectors for zoonotic diseases; however, they contribute to indirect transmission via human travel or trade aiding the spread of vector-borne diseases. Although this mechanical form of transmission differs from vector-borne zoonoses, it illustrates how human movement and activity can influence pathogen spread.

Agricultural landscapes influence vector-borne disease transmission in ways that extend beyond the broad land use changes already described. Livestock farms in particular create ecological conditions that reshape how vectors feed, survive, and interact with hosts. Cattle, sheep, and goats supply large and predictable blood-meal sources that can increase the survival and reproductive success of many mosquito and tick species. As herds occupy the same pastures throughout the year, vectors can remain in close contact with these animals and maintain stable populations even when wildlife abundance fluctuates. This steady availability of blood meals allows pathogens to persist within agricultural settings and increases the likelihood that humans who work with or live near livestock face repeated exposure opportunities. Cattle also influence vector-borne disease risk because they alter how vectors choose hosts and move between them. A systematic review of livestock and vector-borne disease found that cattle can attract large numbers of mosquitoes and ticks, which increases the overall density of vectors in the surrounding area. This attraction can increase the probability that infected vectors will encounter both livestock and humans. The review reported that livestock often serve as reservoir hosts for pathogens such as Babesia, Anaplasma, and Borrelia, which means cattle can help maintain disease cycles that would not persist on human hosts alone. These dynamics place agricultural workers and rural communities at higher risk because they interact directly with both livestock and the vectors that feed on them.

Human activities within agricultural systems strongly influence how vector-borne pathogens circulate in landscapes that also contain livestock. Farming practices that determine where cattle graze, how often herds are moved, and how water resources are managed can shape the distribution of mosquito and tick habitats around human settlements. When humans alter soil moisture through irrigation, trough systems, or pasture drainage, they create microenvironments that allow mosquitoes and ticks to reproduce at higher rates than they would in undisturbed landscapes. These human directed changes in agricultural land increase the number of contact points between vectors, livestock, wildlife, and nearby communities, which strengthens local transmission cycles. Agricultural workers can also move through fields and pastures in ways that unintentionally transport ticks on clothing or equipment, and this movement expands vector presence into adjacent residential areas. Because these environmental changes originate from human land management decisions rather than natural ecological processes, farming activities play a direct role in shaping how vectors establish themselves in agricultural regions.

Human mediated livestock mobility further influences the spread of vector-borne pathogens. When herds are relocated for grazing or transported through trade networks, attached ticks can travel long distances along routes determined by human economic activity. This process introduces vectors into regions where they did not previously occur and can increase the likelihood that new pathogen transmission cycles will form. Movements of cattle between farms, markets, and seasonal pastures also bring vectors into contact with different wildlife communities that can serve as new reservoir hosts. These interactions are shaped not by natural dispersal but by human decisions about livestock production and distribution, which means that agricultural systems act as pathways that enable vectors and pathogens to expand their ranges. Through these mechanisms, human involvement in livestock management continues to influence where vector-borne zoonotic diseases can emerge and persist. Together, these dynamics illustrate how human land-use choices and livestock management practices directly shape the ecological conditions that influence the transmission of vector-borne diseases.

== Epidemiology ==
Climate change has contributed to shifts in the geographic distribution and seasonal patterns of vector-borne diseases. Rising temperatures and changing precipitation patterns have enabled vectors such as mosquitoes and ticks to expand into higher altitudes and latitudes.

Diseases such as dengue, malaria, and chikungunya have shown increased transmission potential in regions previously considered low-risk. In addition, tick-borne diseases such as Lyme disease have increased in incidence in North America and Europe, partly due to warming temperatures and ecological changes.

The burden of vector-borne diseases is disproportionately higher in low- and middle-income countries, where climate-sensitive health systems and limited vector control infrastructure increase vulnerability.

== Control and prevention ==
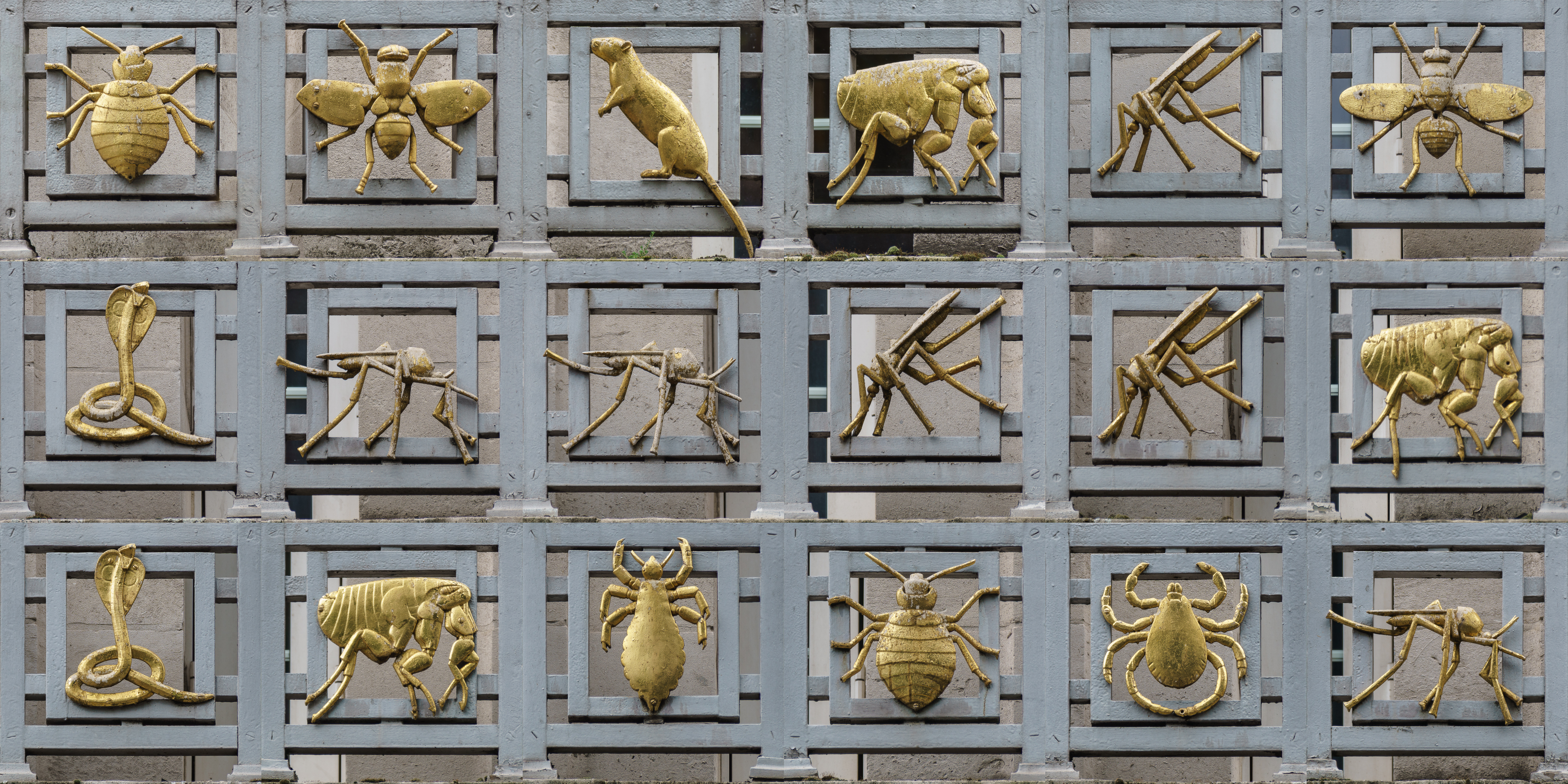
Public health agencies educate people about many different disease vectors. This artwork, at the London School of Hygiene and Tropical Medicine, shows 10 different animal vectors.

The World Health Organization (WHO) calls for the use of integrated vector management to improve the efficiency and sustainability of controlling vector-borne diseases. The goal of integrated vector management is to target vectors and intermediate disease hosts using methods that are as sustainable, efficient, and cost effective as possible. These methods involve using both chemical and non-chemical vector control methods; collaborating with public health sectors as well as other sectors to distribute resources, plan, and make decisions; advocating for public health and for communities; and building career structures and trainings at both local and national levels to manage integrated vector management programs.

Both insecticide-treated nets (ITNs) and indoor residual spraying (IRS) are common methods of controlling mosquito vectors. ITNs are used over beds and have the dual purpose of preventing mosquitoes from biting people and of reducing the number of mosquitoes. IRS involves regularly applying insecticides to the walls of a home, which then kills mosquitoes that land on those walls.

Between 2005 and 2017, ITNs treated with pyrethroids were distributed across the globe with the goal of preventing malaria. In 2017, the WHO updated their recommendation to combine these pyrethroids with piperonyl-butoxide (PBO) to make the nets more effective against mosquitoes that were gaining resistance to pyrethroids. In 2023, the WHO added recommendations for two new kinds of ITNs: pyrethroid-chlorfenapyr nets and pyrethroid-pyriproxyfen nets. Chlorfenapyr is an insecticide that works with pyrethroids to make the nets more deadly to mosquitoes. Pyriproxyfen is an insect growth regulator that disturbs the growth and reproduction of the mosquitoes.

There is research into infecting mosquito populations with the bacteria Wolbachia pipientis to reduce the number of mosquitoes. This bacteria infects a number of invertebrate species and consistently attacks the reproductive system of infected invertebrates. The progeny of an infected male and an uninfected female mosquito are often infertile, so this bacteria could be used for long-term management of mosquito populations. There are two ways that this method could be used: in one, both male and female Wolbachia mosquito carriers would be released into the wild and would eventually replace the wild mosquito population. In the other method, a large number of male Wolbachia carriers would be released, thus creating infertile mosquitoes. This latter method would require consistent release of male Wolbachia carriers. The use of this bacteria to control the mosquito population is more complicated than other forms of vector control and costs more money, however, this method is considered more environmentally friendly and can still be effective in the medium or long term.

Other methods of vector control include veterinary health measures. Dogs can be vaccinated to prevent the spread of rabies. Livestock can be kept away from water sources that act as transmission sites for schistosomiasis. Animals such as cows and pigs can be treated for human African trypanosomiasis and insecticides can be used.

Access to clean water and adequate sanitation is important in limiting the spread of certain diseases, such as schistosomiasis, since contaminated water is how worm eggs are transmitted. In addition, Culex mosquitoes breed well in poorly built latrines, thus contributing to disease spread. As such, ensuring access to safe water and sanitation is an important strategy against a myriad of diseases.

In 2014, the theme for the World Health Organization's World Health Day was "small bite, big threat," urging for action against vector-borne diseases. This theme acted as a reminder of the scale of the vector-borne disease issue, given that, at the time of 2014's World Health Day, vector-borne diseases were responsible for one in six illnesses and disabilities worldwide and that over half the world's population was at risk of vector-borne diseases. In addition, they emphasized that the spread of these diseases is due to social, environmental, and economic factors.

== Prevention and control ==
Strategies to address vector-borne diseases in the context of climate change include integrated vector management, improved surveillance systems, and climate-informed public health planning.

Preventive measures include the use of insecticide-treated bed nets, indoor residual spraying, environmental management to eliminate vector breeding sites, and public education campaigns. Climate-based early warning systems and predictive modeling are increasingly used to anticipate outbreaks and guide timely interventions.

Long-term control efforts emphasize strengthening health systems, enhancing cross-sector collaboration, and incorporating climate adaptation strategies into national and global health policies.

== Mechanisms ==
Climate change affects vector-borne disease transmission through multiple ecological and biological pathways. Increased temperatures can accelerate vector development, biting rates, and pathogen replication within vectors, shortening transmission cycles.

Changes in precipitation influence the availability of breeding habitats for vectors such as mosquitoes, while extreme weather events can disrupt ecosystems and increase human exposure to vectors. Additionally, warming temperatures enable vectors to survive in previously unsuitable regions, expanding the risk of disease transmission.

== Resistance ==
Controlling vector-borne diseases has become increasingly difficult, because many vector species develop resistance to the tools that are used against them. Long-term exposure to insecticides has led mosquitos, ticks, and other arthropods to evolve biological defenses that reduce the otherwise known effectiveness of commonly used chemicals, such as Pyrethrins and Synthetic Pyrethroids.

This issue is particularly important for diseases such as malaria and dengue, which rely heavily on insecticide-based measures such as indoor spraying and insecticide-treated nets. When resistance becomes more widespread, types of interventions like these may offer less protection and require stronger monitoring systems and updated control strategies.

It has been seen that some pathogens are also adapting to control efforts. In malaria-endemic regions, Plasmodium parasites have shown the ability to evade certain antimalarial drugs. This can influence overall disease transmission when treatment becomes less effective. Although this phenomenon affects the pathogen more than the vector, it still complicates efforts to reduce disease spread. For example, Plasmodium parasites become resistant to antimalarial drugs, and infected people can carry higher numbers of transmissible stages for longer. This can increase the chance that mosquitos will pick up and spread the parasite.

Environmental and operational factors also play a role in resistance. Using the same insecticides for extended periods, applying them in inadequate doses, or relying on a single method can accelerate the evolution of resistant vector populations. This has led global health agencies to encourage integrated vector management, which is a framework that combines chemical tools with environmental management, biological control, and improved surveillance to slow the emergence of resistance. By integrating multiple interventions rather than relying on insecticides, integrated vector management helps reduce the selective pressure that drives resistance and promotes more sustainable, effective vector control over the long term.

== See also ==
- Airborne disease
- Asymptomatic carrier
- Fomite
- Globalization and disease
- Insect vectors of human pathogens
- Insect vectors of plant pathogens
- VectorBase: genomic database of invertebrate vectors of human pathogens
- List of diseases caused by insects
- Natural reservoir
- Waterborne disease
- 2007 Yap Islands Zika virus outbreak
