= Tute Genomics =

- Type: Privately held company
- Industry: Genetics
- Founded: 2013
- Founder: Kai Wang and Reid Robison
- Defunct: 2016
- Fate: Acquired
- Successor: PierianDX
- Headquarters: Provo, Utah, United States
- Area served: United States
- Products: Software for annotation of human genomic data
- Website: tutegenomics.com

Tute Genomics was an American genomics startup that provided a cloud-based web application for rapid and accurate annotation of human genomic data. It was built on the expertise of ANNOVAR. Tute Genomics assisted researchers in identifying disease genes and biomarkers, and assisted clinicians/labs in performing genetic diagnosis.

Based in Provo, Utah, Tute was co-founded by Dr. Kai Wang, an assistant professor at the University of Southern California (USC); and Dr. Reid J. Robison, a board-certified psychiatrist with fellowship training in both neurodevelopmental genetics and bioinformatics.

Tute Genomics was acquired by PierianDX in 2016.

== History ==
The word "tute" means "personal" in the Na’vi language created for the 2009 film Avatar by Paul Frommer, a linguist and communications professor at the USC Marshall School of Business.

=== Timeline ===
2013

- Tute Genomics launched in 2013 and entered the accelerator, BoomStartup. By "demo day" of BoomStartup, Tute had raised their seed round of funding and expanded the round to include angel investors from SLC Angels, Park City Angels, Life Science Angels. Tute was the tenth ever online syndicate for AngelList and in all raised a seed round of $1.5 million.

2014

- In March 2014, the company announced that Affiliated Genetics, a Utah-based CLIA-certified laboratory, selected Tute Genomics for its next-generation sequencing (NGS) analytics pipeline.
- In May 2014, the company announced joining the Global Alliance for Genomics and Health.
- In June 2014, Advanced Biological Laboratories (ABL), S.A., announced a licensing and collaboration agreement with Tute Genomics and the commercial launch of OncoChek for managing and analysing genomics data in the field of oncology.
- In July 2014, the company announced an agreement with Lineagen, Inc., to provide next-generation sequencing analytics for Lineagen’s NextStepDx Plus assay. Also, Brigham Young University selected the Tute Genomics genome annotation and discovery platform for analysis and interpretation of 1,000 exomes and genomes.
- In November 2014, the company announced addition of the Tute platform to Illumina’s BaseSpace.
- The company announced a Series A1 funding round of $2.3 million in December 2014. The round was led by UK-based Eurovestech. Peak Ventures and a number of angel investors also participated in this round.

2015

- Tute recruits David Mittelman, founder of Arpeggi, Inc. and former CSO at FamilyTreeDNA, to Tute Genomics as Chief Scientific Officer.
- Tute acquires Knome and integrates the KnoSys platform into its software product.

2016

- Reid Robison, Tute CEO, launches a Kickstarter campaign to sell Tute interpreted whole genome and whole exome sequencing directly to consumers. The campaign was suspended within the same month after receiving a letter from the United States Food and Drug Administration.
- Tute is acquired by PierianDX.
