= PHI-base =

Biological database

Content
- Description: Pathogen-Host Interactions database
- Data types captured: Experimentally verified pathogen–host interaction phenotypes and associated gene and genotype annotations
- Organisms: 348 fungal, bacterial and protist pathogens of agronomic and medical importance tested on 277 hosts

Contact
- Research center: Rothamsted Research
- Primary citation: PMID 39588765
- Release date: May 2005

Access
- Data format: JSON, CSV, XLSX and FASTA
- Website: PHI-base 5: phi5.phi-base.org PHI-base 4: open the PHI-base 5 homepage and select “PHI-base 4”

Tools
- Web: PHI-base 5 Search; PHI-base 4 Search; PHIB-BLAST; PHI-Canto (Author curation)

Miscellaneous
- License: Creative Commons Attribution 4.0 International
- Versioning: Yes
- Data release frequency: 6 monthly
- Version: PHI-base 5: 5.6 (4 July 2026); PHI-base 4: 4.19 (9 February 2026)
- Curation policy: Expert manual and community curation

The Pathogen-Host Interactions database (PHI-base) is a biological database that contains manually curated information on genes experimentally proven to affect the outcome of pathogen-host interactions. The database has been maintained by researchers at Rothamsted Research and external collaborators since 2005. PHI-base has been part of the UK node of ELIXIR, the European life-science infrastructure for biological information, since 2016.

== Background ==
The Pathogen-Host Interactions database was developed to utilise the growing number of verified genes that mediate an organism's ability to cause disease and/or trigger host responses.

The web-accessible database catalogues experimentally verified pathogenicity, virulence, and effector genes from bacterial, fungal, and oomycete pathogens which infect animal, plant, and fungal hosts. PHI-base was the first online resource devoted to the identification and presentation of information on fungal and oomycete pathogenicity genes and their host interactions. PHI-base is a resource for the discovery of candidate targets in medically and agronomically important fungal and oomycete pathogens for intervention with synthetic chemistries and natural products (fungicides).

Each entry in PHI-base is curated by domain experts and supported by strong experimental evidence (gene disruption experiments) as well as literature references in which the experiments are described. Each gene in PHI-base is presented with its nucleotide and deduced amino acid sequence as well as a detailed structured description of the predicted protein's function during the host infection process. To facilitate data interoperability, genes are annotated using controlled vocabularies (Gene Ontology terms, EC Numbers, etc.), and links to other external data sources such as UniProt, EMBL, and the NCBI taxonomy services.

In 2016 the plant portion of PHI-base was used to establish a Semantic PHI-base search tool. PHI-base has been aligned with Ensembl Genomes since 2011, FungiDB since 2016, Global Biotic Interactions (GloBI) since 2018 and Uniprot since 2020. All new PHI-base releases are integrated by these independent databases.

== Community curation ==
Since 2015, the website has been linked to an online literature curation tool called PHI-Canto, enabling community-driven literature curation for various pathogenic species. PHI-Canto employs a community curation framework that not only offers a curation tool but also includes a phenotype ontology and controlled vocabularies using unified languages and rules used in biology experiments. The central concept of this framework is the introduction of a 'Metagenotype', which allows the annotation and assignment of phenotypes to specific pathogen mutant-host interactions. PHI-Canto extends the single species curation tool developed for PomBase, the model organism database for fission yeast.

== Database versions ==
The first complete release of PHI-base 5, version 5.0, was made in March 2024. PHI-base 5 introduced a gene-centric presentation that groups annotations associated with individual pathogen and host genes. It expanded ontology-based annotation to include pathogen–host interaction phenotypes, gene-for-gene phenotypes, pathogen and host phenotypes observed in vitro, physical interactions and gene-expression information. PHI-base 5.6 was released on 4 July 2026. It contains 11,386 genes, 36,954 pathogen–host interactions, 339 pathogen species, 260 host species and information curated from 5,747 publications. The dataset is distributed in JSON and Microsoft Excel formats, accompanied by a JSON Schema. PHI-base 4.19 was released on 9 February 2026. It contains 12,274 pathogen genes, 24,042 pathogen–host interactions, 344 pathogen species, 328 host species and information curated from 5,994 publications. The dataset is distributed as a Frictionless Data Package containing data in CSV format and gene sequences in FASTA format. PHI-base 4 and PHI-base 5 use different data schemas. Releases of both versions continue in parallel while records compatible with the PHI-base 5 schema are migrated from PHI-base 4. PHIB-BLAST allows nucleotide or protein sequences to be compared with gene sequences represented in PHI-base.

== Database access ==
Resource	Link PHI-base 5 PHI-base 5 website - PHI-base 5 datasets PHI-base 5.6 on Zenodo - PHI-base 4 Open the PHI-base 5 homepage and select “PHI-base 4” - PHI-base 4 datasets PHI-base 4 collection on Zenodo - PHI-Canto PHI-Canto community curation

== Applications ==
PHI-base is a resource for many applications including:

- The discovery of conserved genes in medically and agronomically important pathogens, which may be potential targets for chemical intervention
- Comparative genome analyses
- Annotation of newly sequenced pathogen genomes
- Functional interpretation of RNA sequencing and microarray experiments
- The rapid cross-checking of phenotypic differences between pathogenic species when writing articles for peer review

PHI-base use has been cited in over 900 peer-reviewed articles.

== Funding ==
PHI-base is funded by the Biotechnology and Biological Sciences Research Council (BBSRC) through the Growing Health and Delivering Sustainable Wheat Institute Strategic Programmes.
