= Ogden syndrome =

- Other names: Premature aging appearance-developmental delay-cardiac arrhythmia syndrome, N-terminal acetyltransferase deficiency

Ogden syndrome, also known as N-terminal acetyltransferase deficiency (NATD), is an X-linked disorder of infancy comprising a distinct combination of distinctive craniofacial features producing an aged appearance, growth failure, hypotonia, global developmental delays, cryptorchidism, and spontaneous cardiac arrhythmias. The first family was identified in Ogden, Utah, with five affected boys in two generations of family members. A mutation was identified as a c.109T>C (p.Ser37Pro) variant in NAA10, a gene encoding the catalytic subunit of the major human N-terminal acetyltransferase enzyme system (NatA). This same mutation was identified in a second unrelated family, with three affected boys in two generations. This severe genetic disorder has provisionally been named Ogden syndrome, as this is the city where the first affected family resides.

== Signs and symptoms ==
This is an X-linked condition affecting males more than females and is characterized by postnatal growth failure with developmental delays and dysmorphic features characterized by wrinkled forehead, anterior and posterior fontanels, prominent eyes, large down-slanting palpebral fissures, thickened or hooded eyelids, large ears, flared nares, hypoplastic alae nasi, short columella, protruding upper lip, and microretrognathia. There is also delayed closing of fontanelle, and the boys also have broad great toes. Skin is characterized by redundancy or laxity with minimal subcutaneous fat, cutaneous capillary malformations, and very fine hair and eyebrows. Death resulted from cardiogenic shock following arrhythmia, which was noted in all affected individuals. The boys had heart rhythm abnormalities and craniofacial abnormalities, which accounted for their similar appearance. The boys were never able to sit up on their own, and none learned how to talk. They all had a characteristically aged appearance, earning them the family nickname of "little old men." Several of the boys had structural anomalies of their hearts including ventricular septal defect, atrial septal defect, and pulmonary artery stenosis. Events recorded on electrocardiogram before death included torsades de pointes, premature ventricular contraction (PVC), premature atrial contraction (PAC), supraventricular tachycardia (SVtach), and ventricular tachycardia (Vtach). Most of the children had inguinal hernias, and the majority had, at least, unilateral cryptorchidism. All had neonatal hypotonia progressing to hypertonia, and cerebral atrophy on MRI; several, but not all, had neurogenic scoliosis. Death occurred prior to two years in all cases and prior to one year in the majority. There are extensive clinical details for each child reported in the original publication

== Biochemistry ==
Ogden syndrome is a lethal X-linked recessive condition. Because the affected gene is on the X-chromosome, it affects males far more severely due to the fact that males only carry one copy of the X chromosome so the mutation is in every cell but females carry two and therefore some cells may use the non mutated copy and others use the mutated copy. It was the first reported human genetic disorder linked with a mutation in an N-terminal acetyltransferase (NAT) gene. The original Ogden family males have the Ser37Pro (S37P) mutation in the gene encoding NAA10, the catalytic subunit of NatA, the major human enzyme heterodimer involved in the post-translational acetylation of proteins. The S37P mutation swaps one amino acid for another, a serine for a proline, in just one part at the end of the resulting NatA protein subunit. Other mutations have since been discovered in very small number of cases worldwide with the most prevalent being Arg83Cys mutation. Mutations to this gene changes the structure of the protein, which makes it less effective at N-terminal acetylation than the normal protein, causing a multitude of effects for the baby, as N-terminal acetylation is one of the most common protein modifications in humans, occurring on approximately 80% of all human proteins.

== Diagnosis ==
Whole exome sequencing is the definitive diagnostic method used to confirm OS.

== History ==
Halena Black had her first son, Kenny Rae, in 1979. Being that he was her first born child, Black did not notice that something was wrong. Kenny Rae Black passed in 1980, right before his first birthday and was the first known infant to die from Ogden syndrome. However, it did not end there. Halena Black continued to have children and in 1987 she had her next boy, Hyrum. From the start, Black noticed that Hyrum had the same characteristics as Kenny Rae but thought it was due to the fact that they were brothers. Like Kenny Rae, Hyrum passed before his first birthday. It was only until Black's daughters began having children of their own that she realized something was not right. The sons born to Black's daughters looked identical to her own sons and that was when Halena sought medical help.

Answers came thirty years after Kenny Rae's death. Ogden syndrome was discovered in 2011 by a team of researchers led by Gholson J. Lyon, consisting of: Alan F. Rope, Kai Wang, Rune Evjenth, Jinchuan Xing, Jennifer J. Johnston, Jeffrey J. Swensen, W. Evan Johnson, Barry Moore, Chad D. Huff, Lynne M. Bird, John C. Carey, John M. Opitz, Cathy A. Stevens, Tao Jiang, Christa Schank, Heidi Deborah Fain, Reid J. Robison, and 10 others. Just before Lyon was about to publish his findings, another team researching a family living mainly in California contacted him. The newly found family had also lost three infant boys all with similar characteristics. This new family shared the same rare mutation as the Black family. The existence of another family made this mutation a syndrome, and not something isolated.
