= PhytoPath =

Database

Content
- Description: The PhytoPath project collects and integrates genome-scale data from important fungal, oomycete and bacterial plant pathogens with literature-curated information on mutant phenotypes. Data are displayed using the Ensembl Genomes platform.
- Data types captured: Genome-scale data, phenotypes of microbial mutants
- Organisms: 88 fungal, 24 bacterial and 23 protist pathogens

Contact
- Research center: EMBL-EBI and Rothamsted Research
- Primary citation: PMID 26476449
- Release date: 2012

Access
- Data format: FASTA, GFF3
- Website: PhytoPath

Tools
- Web: PhytoPath BioMart search

Miscellaneous
- License: Apache 2.0 software license
- Versioning: Yes
- Data release frequency: quarterly
- Version: PhytoPath is built from 32nd release (Aug 2016) of Ensembl Genomes and version 4.2 of PHI-base

PhytoPath was a joint scientific project between the European Bioinformatics Institute and Rothamsted Research, running from January 2012 to May 30, 2017. The project aimed to enable the exploitation of the growing body of “-omics” data being generated for phytopathogens, their plant hosts and related model species. Gene mutant phenotypic information is directly displayed in genome browsers.

== Background ==
PhytoPath was a bioinformatics resource launched in 2012, which integrated genome scale data from important plant pathogenic species with literature-curated information about the phenotypes of host infection available from the Pathogen-Host Interaction database (PHI-base). It provides access to complete genome assembly and gene models from priority crop and model phytopathogenic species of fungi and oomycetes through the Ensembl Genomes Browser interface. Phytopath also links directly from individual gene sequence models within the Ensembl genome browser to the peer reviewed phenotype information curated within PHI-base. The Phytopath resource aimed to provide tools for comparative analysis of fungal and oomycete genomes. Since the final update - in May 2017 - the database makes accessible 275 genomic sequences in genome browsers from 113 fungal, 25 protist, and 137 bacterial species. Support for community annotation for gene models was provided using the WebApollo online gene editor for some species.
