= Soil-borne wheat mosaic virus =

Virus classification
- (unranked): Virus
- Realm: Riboviria
- Kingdom: Orthornavirae
- Phylum: Kitrinoviricota
- Class: Alsuviricetes
- Order: Martellivirales
- Family: Virgaviridae
- Genus: Furovirus
- Species: Furovirus tritici

Species of virus

Soil-borne wheat mosaic virus is a rod-shaped plant pathogen that can cause severe stunting and mosaic in susceptible wheat, barley and rye cultivars. The disease has often been misdiagnosed as a nutritional problem, but this has actually allowed in part for the fortuitous visual selection by breeding programs of resistant genotypes. Soil-borne wheat mosaic virus is part of the genus Furovirus. Members of this genus are characterized by rigid rod-shaped particles and positive sense RNA genomes consisting of two molecules that are packaged into separate particles that code for either replication, mobility, structure or defense against the host. The virus is spread by a fungal-like protist, Polymyxa graminis, whose asexual secondary and sexual primary cycles help the virus spread. The disease produces secondary symptoms from the root cell infection. The disease is a serious contributor to loss in crop yield.

== Hosts and symptoms ==
The primary host for Soil-borne wheat mosaic virus is the wheat plant, Triticum aestivum, although the virus can also affect rye, barley, and triticale. Symptoms of the disease are primarily found on the leaves. These symptoms include chlorotic leaf mottling or leaf mosaic, rosetting, stunting, streaking, and blotching of leaves. The mosaic and mottling symptoms may range from mild green to yellow, and leaves may sometimes also have dashes, parallel streaks, reddish streaking, and necrosis at the tips. Symptoms usually occur around the same time each year. This time is usually early spring, although in warmer climates it is possible that symptoms can emerge in late fall or early winter. Diseased fields are often uneven in appearance of symptoms especially in low wet areas. This is because the drainage pattern of water on the field is used by the virus to infect plants.

== Disease cycle ==
Soil-borne wheat mosaic virus uses the fungal-like protist Polymyxa graminis, an endoparasitic slime mold as a vector. P. graminis produces resting spores that contain the viral RNA and movement protein for up to 30 years. Dormant resting spores can germinate and produce an infection from the virus containing zoospore. The zoospores need water to reach the host so saturated soil conditions maximize dissemination. When the zoospore reaches the host plant, it encysts on the surface of a cortical root cell and develops a spear like bag which when mature will punch through the adjoining zoospore and host walls. Along with the bag, the zoospore contents as well as the virus particles are emptied into the host cortical cell. How the virus is attached to or carried by the zoospore and how the virus is transferred from the zoospore to the plant root is not fully understood although the actual virus and movement protein but not capsid protein have been found within P. graminis sporosori. After the cortical root cell puncture, one of two types of plasmodia of P. graminis may form inside. These plasmodia differentiate to give rise to either secondary zoospores (part of the asexual secondary cycle) or resting spores, the sexual primary cycle. The infection of the root cells causes substantial stunting and mosaic meaning a local infection on the root with secondary symptoms of stunting and mosaic formation. The virus itself contains two types of particles. The longer particle contains RNA 1, which is approximately 7100 nucleotides long and encodes three proteins. Two of these, measuring 150 kDa and 209 kDa, allow virus replication. The other protein is 37 kDa and allows cell-to-cell movement protein. The 150 kDa and 209 kDa proteins are translated directly from the message sense viral RNA, whereas the 37 kDa protein is expressed via a subgenomic mRNA. The shorter particle contains RNA 2 (approximately 3600 nucleotides), which also encodes three different proteins. The first is the 19 kDa coat or capsid protein (CP). Sometimes, the coat protein UGA termination codon is suppressed allowing translation of an 84 kDa CP-readthrough protein, which is believed to be required for virus transmission by its protist vector P. graminis. The third protein is a 19 kDa cysteine-rich protein that is expressed via a subgenomic mRNA and may function as a suppressor of post-transcriptional gene silencing countering the host resistance to the virus. Optimal temperatures for P. graminis vary depending on where they are found: example 80–86 °F (27–30 °C) in India varies in comparison to Belgium, Canada, Japan. and France (59–64 °F (15–18 °C)) and an optimal temperature for transmission of 59 °F (15 °C) in New York state. Since no significant transmission occurs at 44 °F (7 °C), fall or spring in temperate climates are believed to be the times of the year the infections occur.

== Environment ==
The disease needs an environment that is conducive for infection by the swimming zoospores of the virus’ vector, P. graminis. In dryer environments, infected plants occur in lower lying, wet regions of the field, and in humid climates or climates with more moisture, patches of infection are able to occur anywhere in the field. While the disease is able to proliferate in overall dryer environments as long as there is some moisture, there is still a more optimal environment for the proliferation of the disease. The disease favors an environment with cool weather and temperatures near 60 °F (16 °C), and in the US, Soil-borne wheat mosaic occurs mostly throughout eastern and central areas of the country.

== Management ==
Cultivar resistance to the virus is the most practical strategy to control the disease. Evidence shows it is likely that the resistance prevents the systemic movement to the foliage from the roots, although this resistance will not prevent any replication or movement of cells to roots. Examples of resistant wheat cultivars include the Hawk and Newton cultivars. However, information on the resistance mechanism is still lacking. While there are two important aspects to Soil-borne wheat mosaic, the virus and the vector, resistance is directed more towards the virus rather than the vector. This is because the roots of susceptible cultivars and resistant cultivars can both still be colonized by Polymyxa graminis. Resistance in the wheat line Triticum aestivum can be formed by crossing wheat with a wild diploid ancestor of wheat, Aegilops tauschii. Other cultivars of resistance exist. Most cultivars are resistant to the common strains of the virus. While cultivar resistance is currently the most effective form of resistance, there are a few other ways to help manage the disease. Chemical control in soil fumigants provide control against the vector P. graminis, but these fumigants are not feasible economically in use of small grains. The sanitation of machinery is important to avoid the introduction of the virus into new areas by soil transport, and sanitation is a more economical option for the management of disease. ELISA and RealTime PCR can be used to confirm diagnosis of infected plants.

== Importance ==
Soil-borne wheat mosaic virus is currently distributed over most of the eastern and central United States. Since the first European report in 1960, the virus has rapidly spread on the European continent and is abundant in France, Germany, Italy, and the United Kingdom. In the initial period of Soil-borne wheat mosaic virus research, host genotypes susceptible to rosette stunting were common and yield losses were recorded at over 50%. Today, while close monitoring for rosette phenotype has decreased the yield losses, plants still exhibit the mosaic phenotype leading to possible significant yield loss. Due to the fact that the viral symptoms are short lived and mimic nutritional deficiencies, the virus's economic significance is often overlooked. The virus contributes to lower kernel weight, tiller number, and test weight leading to lower grain yield leading to a loss in profit.
