= Knome =

Former human genome interpretation company

Knome, Inc.
- Company type: Private
- Industry: Information technology
- Founded: 2007
- Fate: Acquired by Tute Genomics, Inc. in 2015 (which later becomes a subsidiary of PierianDX, Inc. in 2016)
- Headquarters: Cambridge, Massachusetts, United States
- Key people: Dr. George Church (founder & Chief Scientific Advisor); Jorge Conde (founder); Sundar Subramaniam (founder & Chairman)
- Services: Human genome interpretation

Knome, Inc. was a human genome interpretation company based in Cambridge, Massachusetts. Launched in 2007, Knome focused on improving quality of life by applying insights gained from the interpretation of human genomes. They helped identify and classify the variants, genes, and gene sets that are likely to govern or underlie a specific disease, tumor, or drug response. Their clients included academic, pharmaceutical and medical researchers. In 2015, it was acquired by Tute Genomics.

== Technology ==
Knome developed technologies that automated many of the manual tasks involved in interpreting whole human genomes. These technologies were designed to address the informatics and workflow bottlenecks that typically hinder whole genome interpretation. The company's core technology, kGAP, was developed in 2009 and served as the foundation for a number of Knome's products and services including the knoSYS® platform.

== Products and services ==
For academic, pharmaceutical, and medical researchers, Knome offered:

knoSYS® Platform
Provides labs with a scalable, production-grade informatics system for the analysis, annotation, and interpretation of human next-gen sequence data (genome, exome, targeted gene).

knomeDISCOVERY
Research services include project-driven curation, sophisticated informatics, and in-depth interpretation by Knome's team of experienced geneticists.

== Timeline ==
- 2007 – Knome was co-founded by George M. Church based on the recognition that the rapidly falling price of whole genome sequencing would create substantial market need for whole genome interpretation technologies and services.
- 2008 – Knome interpreted the genome of the third named person to be sequenced—Dan Stoicescu (who followed James Watson and Craig Venter).
- 2009 – Knome launched kGAP, a cloud-based informatics engine.
- 2010 – Knome successfully assisted researchers at the University of British Columbia to identify the sixth known inherited gene defect causing Parkinson's disease.
- 2012 – Knome was selected as a technology partner by Johns Hopkins School of Medicine to analyze 1,000 genomes for asthma study.
- 2015 – Knome acquired by Tute Genomics (which later becomes a subsidiary of PierianDX in 2016).

== In the media ==
New York Times
In February 2013, the New York Times featured the knoSYS: "a powerful computer packed with software has arrived to interpret sequences privately within the walls of a lab".

NOVA
In March 2012, Knome appeared on a special episode of NOVA, "Cracking Your Genetic Code". In the show, Knome helped describe how the interpretation of human genomes is helping to solve medical mysteries and revolutionize personal healthcare.

Faces of America
In September 2011, Knome was featured in the four-part PBS series Faces of America with Henry Louis Gates, Jr. The series followed Harvard scholar Henry Louis Gates, Jr. as he used advanced genetics tools to explore the ancestral histories of 12 renowned Americans, uncovering unique stories of immigration that illuminate the American experience. On the program, Knome scientists illuminated the striking "mosaic" of ancestry in Professor Gates' and his father's genomes, tracing their ancestry to Africa, Europe, and beyond. By comparing the two genomes to each other, they revealed the shared genetic heritage of a father and son, including aspects of their health risks and strengths. Further, by documenting the parts of their genomes that the two men did not share, Knome's analysis offered a glimpse of the genome of Professor Gates' late mother.

Ozzy Osbourne
In 2010, Knome famously interpreted the genomes of Ozzy and Sharon Osbourne. The study uncovered notable differences in Ozzy's genes that were linked to drug and alcohol response, which shed light on how the famously hard-living rocker has survived decades of drug abuse. Several major news outlets including CNN and ABC picked up the story.
