= Reid Robison =

American psychiatrist

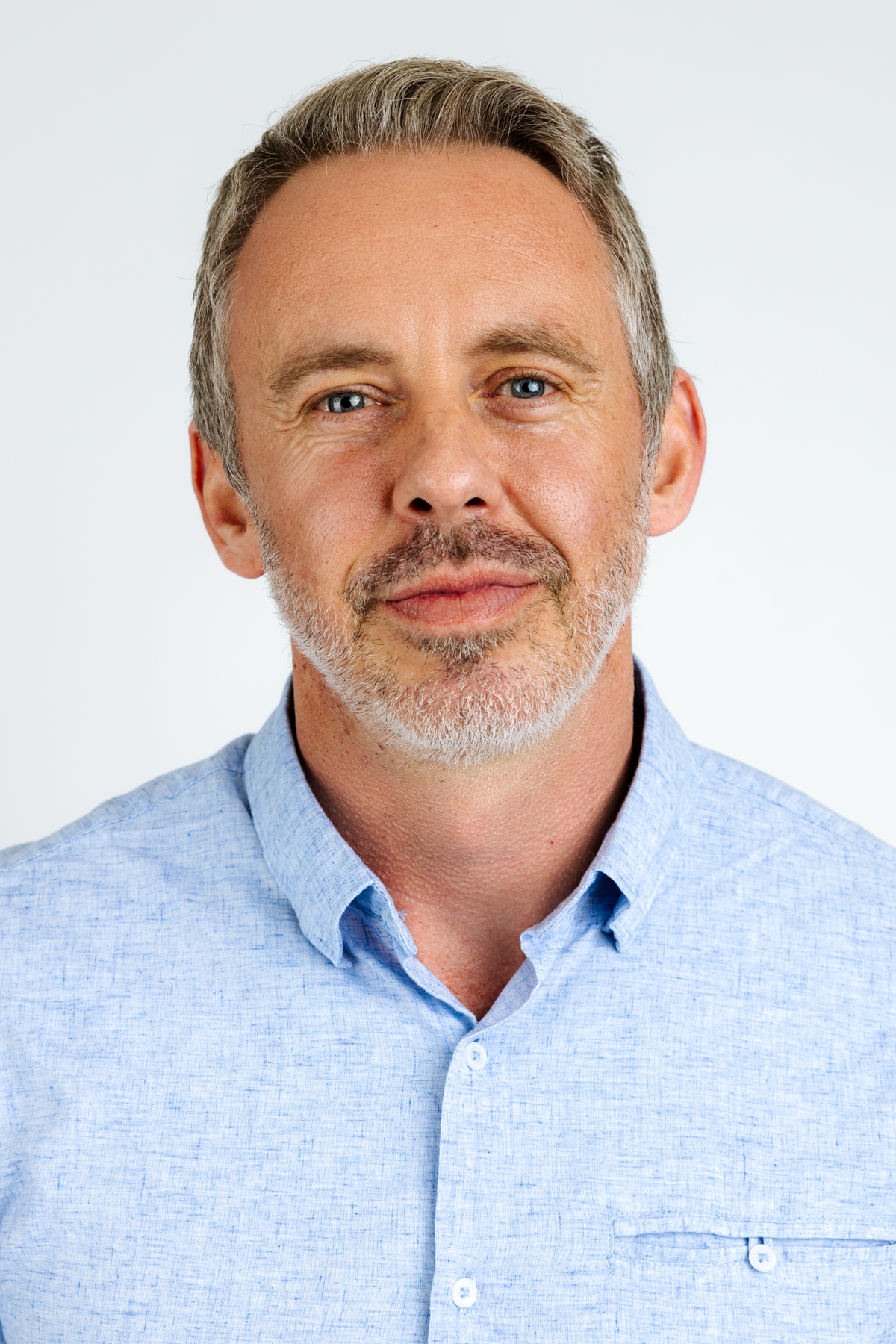
- Born: September 11, 1976 (age 50); Hinsdale, Illinois, U.S.
- Scientific career
- Education: University of Utah (M.D.); University of Utah (M.B.A.); Brigham Young University (B.S.)
- Fields: Psychiatry; Mental Health; Psychedelic Therapy
- Website: https://www.reidrobison.com/

Reid Robison (born September 1976 in Illinois) is an American board-certified psychiatrist known primarily for his work with psychedelic medicines. As an early adopter and researcher of the use of ketamine in psychiatry, Robison has made significant contributions to ketamine-assisted psychotherapy (KAP) and other treatment modalities using ketamine for mental health conditions. He previously served as coordinating investigator for a study on MDMA-assisted psychotherapy for eating disorders, sponsored by the Multidisciplinary Association for Psychedelic Studies (MAPS), and he continues to lead research and psychiatric clinical trials involving psychedelics. To date, Robison has guided thousands of ketamine-assisted therapy sessions and Spravato dosing sessions. He currently serves as Medical Director of Center for Change, an eating disorder treatment center in Utah, and Chief Clinical Officer of Numinus, a Vancouver-based mental health company focused on psychedelic research and treatments. Robison is an adjunct professor at both the University of Utah and Brigham Young University.

== Education and early life ==
Robison was born in 1976 near Chicago and grew up living in Toronto, Canada. He returned to the United States for college and received a B.S. in Neuroscience from Brigham Young University, in 2001, after which he attended the University of Utah School of Medicine in Salt Lake City. Upon earning a dual M.D./M.B.A in 2005, he completed psychiatry residency training at the University of Utah, followed by fellowship training in genetics and bioinformatics at the University of Utah.

== Career and research ==
After his fellowship, Robison held a faculty position at the University of Utah School of Medicine from 2009 to 2011. Here, he served as the Associate Director of the Mood Disorders Clinic and co-directed the Psychiatric Molecular Genetics lab where he focused his research primarily on the genetic associations of autism, and also contributed to the discovery of Ogden Syndrome, a rare disease found using next-generation sequencing technology. During his time as faculty within the Department of Psychiatry he also led global health initiatives and guided trainees during trips to Haiti, Ghana and refugee camps along the Thai/Burma border.

Early in his career, Robison founded the Polizzi Foundation, a free clinic based in Salt Lake City offering mental health services to the uninsured. He also co-founded Clinical Methods, a center for clinical trials, with a Clark W Johnson MD, his medical school colleague and business partner. Clinical Methods was acquired by CRI-Lifetree in 2012 and later PRA Health Sciences.

Robison has also been closely involved with Intermountain Healthcare, the largest healthcare provider in the mountain west region of the United States. Robison set up the Consult-Liaison Service at Intermountain Medical Center, Intermountain’s flagship hospital, to provide psychiatric consults to the emergency department and medical floors. After conducting his first research study of ketamine in 2011, he went on to create a ketamine program for treatment-resistant depression at Intermountain’s IV Therapy Center. In 2012, he obtained a grant to study ketamine for depression from the Intermountain Research & Medical Foundation.

In 2012, Robison and computational biologist Kai Wang co-founded Tute Genomics, a personalized medicine software company which sought to increase practice of genomic medicine. In 2016, Tute Genomics was acquired by PierianDx. Robison currently sits on the board of directors. Robison is recognized for speeding up genomic data transfer and analysis through the use of Google Fiber.

Later, Robison and a colleague co-founded Cedar Psychiatry, a network of outpatient mental health clinics offering ketamine therapy, transcranial magnetic stimulation (TMS), medication management, and psychotherapy, and Cedar Clinical Research in 2018. At Cedar Clinical Research, Robison led the Utah site for the pivotal IV ketamine study of treatment-resistant depression by Janssen, leading up to the company’s FDA-approval of Spravato (esketamine) via breakthrough therapy designation in 2019. After the companies were acquired in 2020, by Novamind, a Canadian company endeavoring to bring psychedelic medicine into the mental health field, Robison was appointed as the Chief Medical Officer. Upon the acquisition of Novamind by Numinus, another Canadian-based company with expertise in psychedelic medicine, Robison became the Chief Clinical Officer of Numinus. In this role, Robison continues to oversee the ketamine therapy practice at Cedar Psychiatry for treating depression, PTSD, eating disorders, OCD and other mental health conditions.

Robison also continues in his as Medical Director of Center for Change, an eating disorder treatment center in Utah.

Robison also co-founded Inner Space Research, a psychiatry-focused clinical research center in Orem, Utah, where he serves as Chief Medical Officer.

== Awards and recognition ==
- In 2014, Robison was named one of the Utah Venture Entrepreneur Forum peak 100 entrepreneurs of the year.
- In 2015, Robison was named one of the top 40 healthcare transformers of the year,
- In 2020, Robison was named Best Psychiatrist in Utah.

== Yoga ==
Robison is a certified Yoga instructor and completed his training under Sri Dharma Mittra in New York City. He often speaks and writes about yoga and mindfulness for mental health.
