= Furovirus =

Virus classification
- (unranked): Virus
- Realm: Riboviria
- Kingdom: Orthornavirae
- Phylum: Kitrinoviricota
- Class: Alsuviricetes
- Order: Martellivirales
- Family: Virgaviridae
- Genus: Furovirus

Genus of viruses

Furovirus is a genus of viruses, in the family Virgaviridae. Graminae, winter wheat, wheat, triticale, oat, sorghum bicolor, and plants serve as natural hosts. There are seven species in this genus. Diseases associated with this genus include: (SBWMV): green and yellow mosaic.

== Taxonomy ==
The following species are assigned to the genus, listed by scientific name and followed by their common names:

- Furovirus avenae, Oat golden stripe virus
- Furovirus cerealis, Soil-borne cereal mosaic virus
- Furovirus chinense, Chinese wheat mosaic virus
- Furovirus hypochaeris, Hypochaeris mosaic virus
- Furovirus japonicum, Japanese soil-borne wheat mosaic virus
- Furovirus sorghi, Sorghum chlorotic spot virus
- Furovirus tritici, Soil-borne wheat mosaic virus

== Structure ==
Viruses in the genus Furovirus are non-enveloped, with rod-shaped geometries, and helical symmetry. The diameter is around 20 nm, with a length of 260-300 nm. Genomes are linear and segmented, around 3.5-3.6kb in length.

Genus	Structure	Symmetry	Capsid	Genomic arrangement	Genomic segmentation
Furovirus	Rod-shaped	Helical	Non-enveloped	Linear	Segmented

== Life cycle ==
Viral replication is cytoplasmic. Entry into the host cell is achieved by penetration into the host cell. Replication follows the positive stranded RNA virus replication model. Positive stranded rna virus transcription is the method of transcription. Translation takes place by suppression of termination. The virus exits the host cell by monopartite non-tubule guided viral movement. Graminae, winter wheat, wheat, triticale, oat, sorghum bicolor, host, and plants serve as the natural host. The virus is transmitted via a vector (fungus). Transmission routes are vector.

Genus	Host details	Tissue tropism	Entry details	Release details	Replication site	Assembly site	Transmission
Furovirus	Plants	None	Unknown	Viral movement	Cytoplasm	Cytoplasm	Mechanical inoculation: fungus
