= Vector incrimination =

Method to determine pathogen transmission

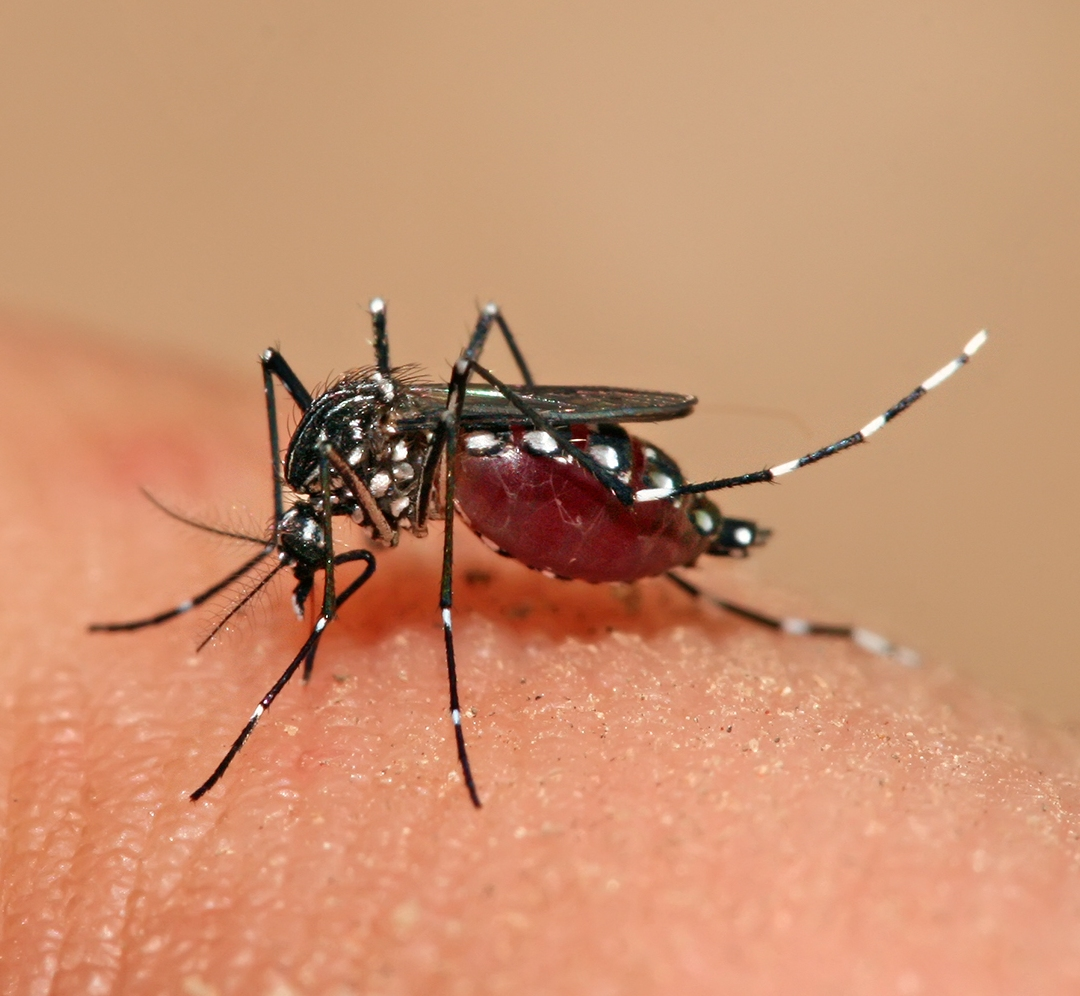
Mosquitoes are a known vector of many pathogens.

In epidemiology, vector incrimination refers to the process of proving that a particular species, a specific vector of disease, is responsible for the transmission of a pathogen to hosts. This study is used in the identification and control of mosquito species as carriers of diseases such as malaria.

In order to decide whether a species is responsible for the spread of a pathogen, a number of parameters must be examined. The abundance and presence of organisms within a species that are infected with a pathogen, the age and parity of a vector, and the feeding behaviours of the vector are some of these parameters. From here, professionals can calculate the biting rate, infectivity, vectorial capacity and inoculation rate of the vector. In mosquitoes, the condition of the abdomen and digestion can be used to determine how often they feed, and dissection of salivary glands can be used as detection for the presence of sporozoites of a pathogen.

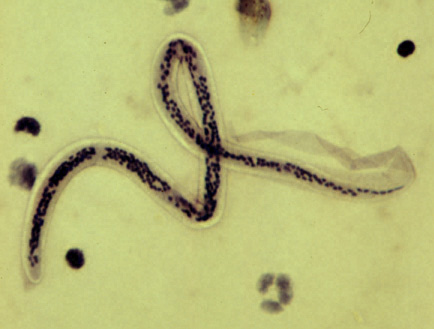
Wuchereria bancrofti, a worm that causes lymphatic filariasis.

In a 2025 study, mosquitoes of the genera Aedes, Anopheles, Culex and Mansonia were incriminated as vectors of lymphatic filariasis, a tropical disease caused by Wuchereria bancrofti, Brugia malayi and Brugia timori. Mosquitoes were collected from areas within the range of the infection. The mosquitoes were then identified, segregated, and pooled. Using molecular tools, the specimens were tested for the presence of W. bancrofi. The studied resulted in Culex quinquefasciatus as the vector of the pathogen.

== Criteria ==
The criteria to determine whether a vector is the cause of a pathogen's spread were originally outlined by Barnett (1962) and are as follows:

1. Demonstrate that the vector bites a host. This must not be forced, but instead using bait traps. Afterwards, bloodmeals can be identified via various methods.
2. Vectorial competence. Show that the vector is able to transmit the pathogen. Can they feed on an infected animal, and transmit it to an uninfected animal?
3. Demonstrate that the distributions align. Ensure that the distribution and range of the vector occur in the same area as that of the disease. Is the vector abundant in the same regions the disease is?
4. Indistinguishability. Demonstrate that natural infections from the vector parasites are indistinguishable from parasites from infected animals. This can be done through dissection, parasite culturing and identification.

Once the species is established as the cause of disease, surveillance is conducted on it to determine vector density and pathogen presence. Surveillance is the observation, collection, and recording of data regarding the possible presence of pathogens in the vector.
