= VectorBase =

VectorBase is one of the five Bioinformatics Resource Centers (BRC) funded by the National Institute of Allergy and Infectious Diseases (NIAID), a component of the National Institutes of Health (NIH), which is an agency of the United States Department of Health and Human Services. VectorBase is focused on invertebrate vectors of human pathogens working with the sequencing centers and the research community to curate vector genomes (mainly genome annotation).

== Genomes covered in the VectorBase database ==
- Aedes aegypti
- Anopheles gambiae
- Culex quinquefasciatus
- Ixodes scapularis
- Pediculus humanus
- Rhodnius prolixus

== Tools available through the VectorBase site ==
- Genome browser
- Community annotation system
- Microarray and gene expression repository
- Controlled vocabularies for anatomy, insecticide resistance and vector-borne diseases (malaria and dengue fever)
- BLAST searches for all covered genomes

== See also ==
- Vectors in epidemiology
