= Polymyxa graminis =

Scientific classification
- Domain: Eukaryota
- Clade: Diaphoretickes
- Clade: SAR
- Clade: Rhizaria
- Phylum: Endomyxa
- Class: Phytomyxea
- Order: Plasmodiophorida
- Family: Plasmodiophoridae
- Genus: Polymyxa
- Species: P. graminis

Binomial name
- Polymyxa graminis Ledingham

Species of single-celled organism

Polymyxa graminis is a species of plasmodiophorid cercozoans. It is an obligate parasite of plant roots and, though itself non-pathogenic, is responsible for the transmission of several very important plant viruses, including barley yellow mosaic virus (BaYMV) and soil-borne wheat mosaic virus (SBWMV).
