= Barley yellow mosaic virus =

Virus classification
- (unranked): Virus
- Realm: Riboviria
- Kingdom: Orthornavirae
- Phylum: Pisuviricota
- Class: Stelpaviricetes
- Order: Patatavirales
- Family: Potyviridae
- Genus: Bymovirus
- Species: Bymovirus hordeiluteum

Species of virus

Barley yellow mosaic virus is plant pathogenic virus that causes the yellow mosaic disease of barley. Its shape is categorized as being flexuous filamentous, with lengths of 275 and 550 nanometers. The virus has a limited host range, and barley appears to be the only known susceptible host. The virus is transmitted via Polymyxa graminis, which is a plasmodiophorid protist, through the resting spores that survive in the soil, and eventually zoospores. Eastern Asia is the most affected region, but the virus can be found worldwide. Current agricultural practices have been ineffective at eliminating the virus, but breeding resistance appears to be the only way to help reduce the disease.

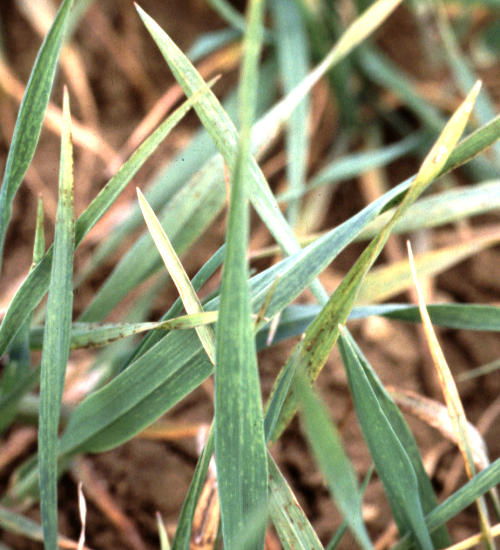
Symptoms of barley yellow mosaic virus on barley cultivar Igri.

== Hosts and symptoms ==
Barley (Hordeum vulgare) is the only current known host for the virus. Other species of Hordeum have been experimentally inoculated and exhibited similar symptoms, but this has since been categorized as a different strain of disease called barley mild mosaic virus. When dealing with viruses, it is important to understand that symptoms are not reliable in diagnosing the specific virus. That being said, the signature symptom exhibited by the barley from the virus is a yellowing and mosaic flecking of the youngest leaves that often appears in the winter or early spring. Early on the plant leaves begin to show a pale green color, and over time the changes become more drastic with severe yellowing and mosaic patterns. In addition, leaf curl, stunting, and necrosis can all be observed.

The symptoms are categorized as systemic, due to the spread of the disease throughout the plant. Once the virus enters the plant through the root cells via Polymyxa graminis it is able to multiply and spread throughout the plant. The symptoms arise due to the virus's ability to hack into the plant cells' machinery, which disrupts the normal cycle of the plant.

== Disease cycle ==
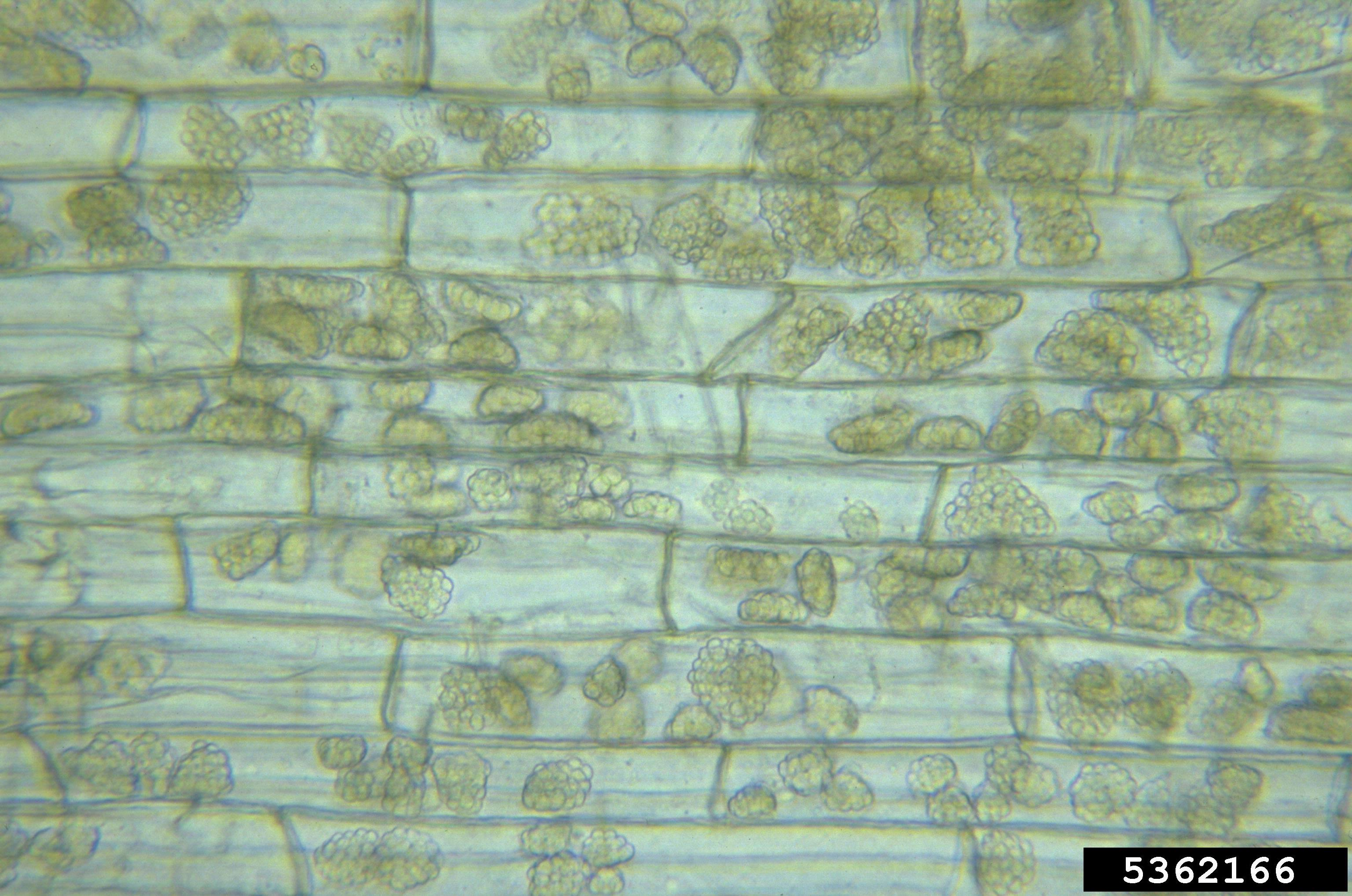
This picture shows resting spores of Polymyxa graminis, the vector of Barley yellow mosaic virus.

Barley yellow mosaic virus (BaYMV) is a virus, and therefore doesn't divide, produce energy, or have any reproductive structures. The only way BaYMV is able to multiply is by "taking over" host cells and manufacturing more viruses. It is spread through the protist Polymyxa graminis, so its disease cycle largely depends on that of P. graminis. P. graminis is a soil-borne pathogen, so it is spread by tools, water, animals, and other means of physically moving soil. BaYMV overwinters in the resting spores of P. graminis, and can survive decades in this state. When P. graminis invades the roots of a plant and begins growing in the root cells, the BaYMV is transmitted from protist to barley through zoospores. It then can enter barley plant cells and use the cell machinery to make more virus, thus infecting the plant. The virus does this by using its coat protein to gain access into plant cells, and then taking over cell machinery in the nucleus. It uses the cell machinery to manufacture more virus, and can rapidly reproduce this way. Once a plant is infected, there is no known way to "cure" the plant, so the plant stays infected indefinitely. The virus remains in the resting spores in the soil, and in this way it can infect other plants, overwinter, or be spread via cultivation or harvest (spreading the soil).

BaYMV is known as a systemic plant pathogenic virus, which means it is transmitted throughout the plant via the plant's natural pathways. Once the virus has taken over the cell's machinery and begins copying the virus, it is then able move from cell to cell via movement proteins, which are produced by the virus. The virus continues to travel until it eventually gets into the vascular system, from which it can travel throughout the plant and continue to infect new plant cells.

== Environment ==
BaYMV is found mainly in Eastern Asia and Western Europe. Common countries to find the virus include Japan, China, Ukraine, Greece, Germany, English, Belgium, and France. It has also recently been discovered in Poland. The conditions which favor the virus are cold winters and mild, wet autumns. This is because factors which are conducive to virus infection are conditions that favor Polymyxa graminis, the organism that transmits the virus. Polymyxa graminis is a protist and thus thrives in wet conditions, so this would favor BaYMV activity. If conditions are dry, infection may occur in lower and wetter regions of a field because the wet conditions will allow the zoospores of P. graminis to swim with ease.

== Management ==
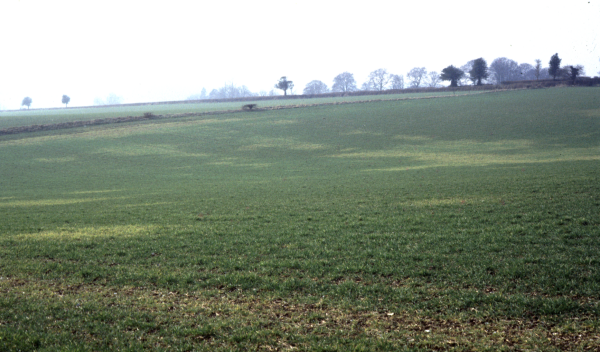
Patches of barley yellow mosaic virus in field of barley, cultivar Panda, growing at Hemel Hempstead, UK.

Once a plant is infected with BaYMV, it is infected for the plant's lifetime. When the virus is in the soil, it remains there in the resting spores for years. It can also infect barley roots in autumn, remain there for the winter, and then infect the upper part of the plant in spring through the phloem. We currently do not know of a way to cure a plant with this disease. For this reason, prevention is key when trying to control this disease. Chemical controls, crop rotation, and soil sanitation have all proven rather ineffective at combating the virus. Resistance is the main way of controlling BaYMV at this time. Researchers have discovered 15 recessive and 3 dominant genes that are resistant to the virus, but none of them are completely resistant. Furthermore, new virulent strains of the virus are constantly emerging. Even when a certain gene provides resistant to one strain, there are oftentimes other strains that it is susceptible to. To further complicate matters, the mechanism of resistance is still unknown. However, since resistance yields the best results at this point, this is the primary measure of control.

Resistant cultivars are sold across Europe and have been used with mild success. A study performed in Japan yielded positive results for resistance to BaYMV when using Kashimamugi, Haruna Nijo, and Haganemugi, which are all barley cultivars. These cultivars yielded no symptoms after inoculation, and it appears specific genes are responsible for resistance.

== Importance ==
The main problem with the BaYMV, or any cereal virus for that matter, is that it is an important cash crop for a number of different uses. Some examples include animal feed, beer and alcohol production, and a number of other essential items. This valuable resource has suffered tremendous losses due to the barley yellow mosaic virus. Numbers have reached upwards of 50% yield loss in the United Kingdom at times, and up to 80% yield loss in Japan. This would equate to losing 255 million dollars in one year in the UK, and even more in Japan if barley yields remain steady. The most significant problems can be found in Eastern Asia and the United Kingdom.

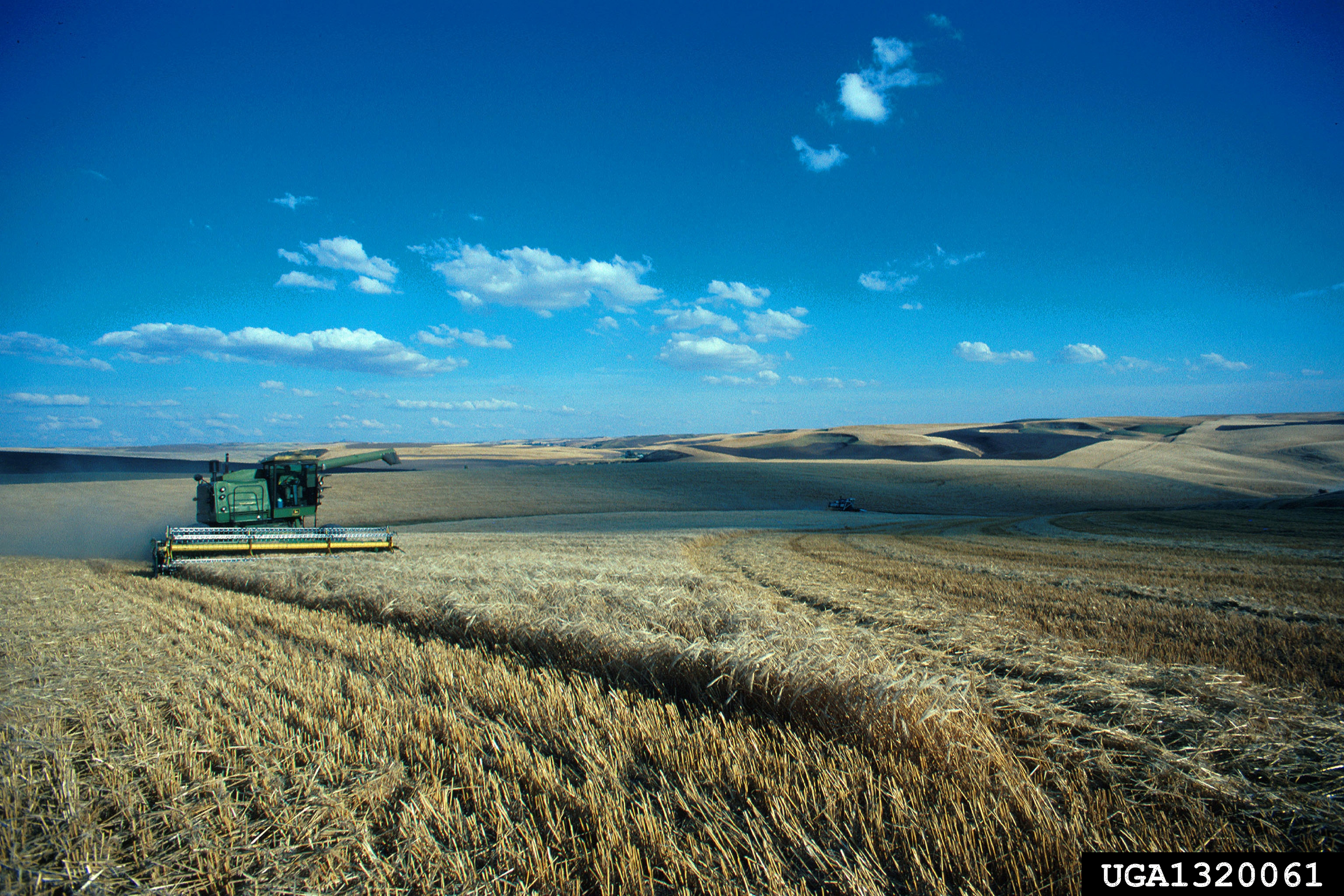
This image shows barley being harvested: it is an important crop in several countries but can be destroyed by Barley yellow mosaic virus
