= Lineagen =

Private biotechnology company

Lineagen, Inc.
- Type: Private
- Industry: Biotechnology
- Founded: March 2006
- Founders: Michael S. Paul, Andy Peiffer
- Headquarters: Salt Lake City, Utah, United States
- Products: personal genome testing
- Services: Genetic testing, medical research

Lineagen, Inc. is a privately held personal genomics and biotechnology company based in Salt Lake City, UT. The company was incorporated in 2006 and collaborated with two leading autism research institutions: the University of Utah and The Children's Hospital of Philadelphia (CHOP), to identify novel genetic variants likely causal of autism spectrum disorder. Lineagen was granted an exclusive commercial license to these novel genetic variants. Notably, the markers from CHOP, published in Nature and PLoS Genetics, were named by TIME magazine as one of the top ten medical breakthroughs of 2009.

Since 2010, Lineagen provides genetic laboratory services to healthcare providers, which include fluorescence in situ hybridization (FISH), karyotyping and chromosomal microarray testing for children with childhood development disorders. In 2012, Lineagen and Affymetrix, Inc. announced that the companies have signed an agreement where Lineagen receives exclusive rights to develop a proprietary chromosomal microarray assay based on Affymetrix' GeneChip technology platform.
