= List of biomedical cybernetics software =

The following is a list of software packages and applications for biocybernetics research.

== Data formats and specifications ==
- Systems Biology Markup Language (SBML)
- Biological Pathway Exchange (BioPAX)
- CellML
- Minimum Information About a Simulation Experiment (MIASE)
- Minimum information required in the annotation of models (MIRIAM)
- Systems Biology Ontology (SBO)
- Systems Biology Graphical Notation (SBGN)

== Libraries for software development ==
- CyberUnits, a class library for computer simulations in life sciences

== Software products ==
- SimThyr – Simulation system for thyroid homeostasis

== See also ==
- List of sequence alignment software
- List of open-source healthcare software
- List of open-source bioinformatics software
- List of proprietary bioinformatics software
- List of freeware health software
- List of molecular graphics systems
- List of systems biology modeling software
- Comparison of software for molecular mechanics modeling
- BioLinux

== Other collections ==
- PhysioToolkit Software Index: PhysioNet's software collection
