= Nicolas Le Novère =

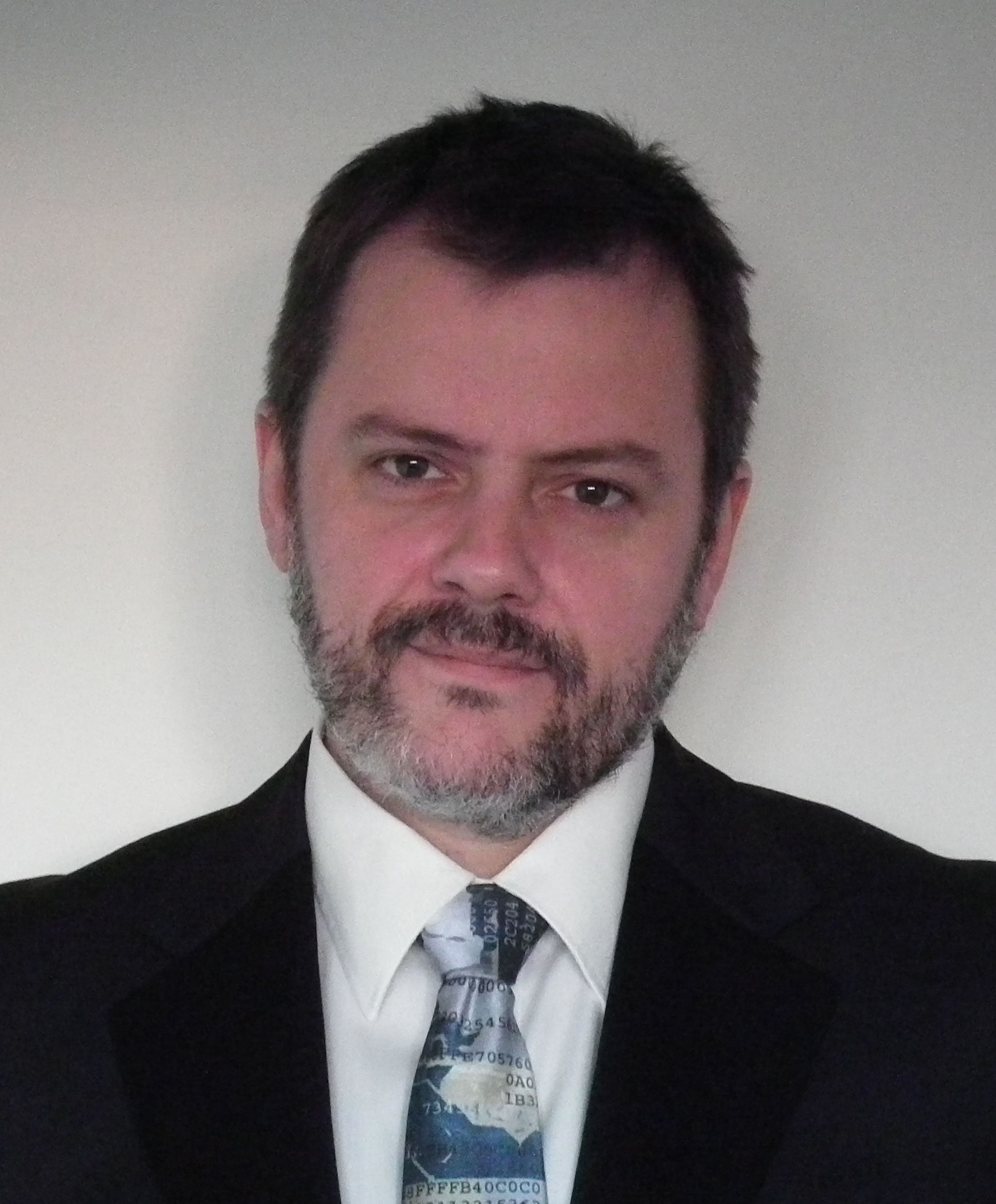
- Born: 12 March 1969 (age 57)
- Education: École Normale Supérieure; Pierre and Marie Curie University; University of Paris-Sud
- Known for: BioModels Database, SBGN, SBML, MIRIAM
- Scientific career
- Fields: Computational biology; Bioinformatics; Neuroscience; Systems biology
- Workplaces: Babraham Institute; European Bioinformatics Institute (EMBL-EBI); University of Cambridge; Pasteur Institute
- Academic advisors: Jean-Pierre Changeux; Dennis Bray

Nicolas Le Novère is a British and French biologist. His research focuses on modeling signaling pathways and developing tools to share mathematical models.

== Education ==
Le Novère obtained his Baccalauréat at the Prytanée National Militaire. He received a MSc (1993) in Biology and Biochemistry from the École Normale Supérieure, a BSc in Cellular Biology and Physiology (1991), and a PhD in Molecular and Cellular Pharmacology (1998) from the Pierre and Marie Curie University. From 1999 to 2001, he was a Postdoctoral Fellow at the University of Cambridge (UK).

== Research ==
The first part of Le Novère's career, in the laboratory of Jean-Pierre Changeux at the Pasteur Institute, was focused on studying Nicotinic acetylcholine receptors in the brain. He reconstructed their phylogeny, predicted and modeled their structure. He also investigated the role of the alpha6 subunit in the dopaminergic neurons of the mesencephalon.

During his post-doctoral fellowship in the group of Dennis Bray at the University of Cambridge, he modeled the molecular networks underlying bacterial chemotaxis. Le Novère then became involved in the development standards to share mathematical models such as SBML, of which he would later become editor.

In 2003, Le Novère built a research group at the European Bioinformatics Institute (EMBL-EBI). The group studied the signaling pathways underlying synaptic plasticity, in particular the allosteric calcium sensors. In parallel, his group coordinated the development of a consistent set of standards in systems biology, including the graphical notation SBGN, the guidelines MIRIAM and MIASE, the languages SED-ML and PharmML, and ontologies such as the Systems Biology Ontology. He also created BioModels Database and the Identifiers.org URIs.

Le Novère moved his group to the Babraham Institute from 2012 to 2018.

He was associate editor of the journals BMC Systems Biology and npj Systems Biology and Applications until September 2018. He has been section head for the section Systems and Network Biology of the Faculty of 1000 from 2017 to 2018.

Senior member of the International Society for Computational Biology, he served on its board of directors from 2017 to 2018.

== Conviction ==
In September 2018, Le Novère was sentenced for 8 month (suspended for 2 years) when he admitted downloading indecent images of a child and possession of an extreme pornographic image. Subsequently, he was dismissed from the Babraham Institute where he was working.
