= SBSCL =

Java based systems biology simulator library

- Original authors: Andreas Dräger, Roland Keller, Alexander Dörr
- Developer: Community contributors
- Initial release: August 12, 2011; 14 years ago
- Stable release: 2.1 / April 21, 2021; 4 years ago
- Written in: Java™
- Operating system: Linux, macOS and Microsoft Windows
- License: LGPL
- Website: github.com/draeger-lab/SBSCL

The Systems Biology Simulation Core Library (SBSCL) is an open-source, cross-platform pure Java™ programming library that supports the simulation and analysis of computational models encoded in SBML (Systems Biology Markup Language) and SED-ML (Simulation Experiment Description Markup Language) formats. SBSCL offers a robust and extensible Java-based implementation of numerical solvers and simulation algorithms, making it a valuable tool for researchers and developers in systems biology.

SBSCL, built on top of another open-source library, JSBML, enables platform-independent model simulation across any environment supporting the Java Virtual Machine. It includes a comprehensive suite of numerical methods for solving ordinary differential equations and other dynamic behaviors described in biological models.

SBSCL is designed as a reusable software library and does not come with a GUI or a CLI by default. Instead, it is intended to be embedded into larger software projects where custom user interfaces can be developed as needed. Researchers can also integrate SBSCL directly into their Java projects via its Apache Maven or Gradle dependency to programmatically simulate SBML models.

== Capabilities ==
SBSCL offers a wide range of features for simulating and analyzing computational models in systems biology.

=== 1. Numerical simulation in an ordinary differential equation framework ===
- LSODA-Integrator (Livermore Solver for Ordinary Differential Equation Automatic) for the simulation of models containing general ODEs
- Rosenbrock solver for the integration of stiff differential equation systems
- Several solvers from the Apache Commons Math Library are included.
- Clear separation of SBML interpretation and integration routines
- Fast SBML interpretation by using a transformed syntax graph
- Full support of SBML events, algebraic rules, and fast reactions
- Support of all models from the SBML Test Suite for all levels and versions
- Compatible with Flux Balance Constraints (fbc) and Hierarchical Model Composition (comp) extensions.

=== 2. Stochastic simulation framework ===
- Supports different solvers from the FERN library
- The Gillespie Algorithm is used currently to solve the SBML models.
- Support of models from the Stochastic Test Suite for all levels and versions

=== 3. Linear optimization framework ===
- Incorporation of external implementations of the simplex algorithm in libraries, such as Gurobi, CPLEX, and many more, supports simulating models via linear optimization.
- At the moment, the implementation comprises flux balance analysis.

=== 4. Support for SED-ML ===
- Fully interprets and simulates models described in the Simulation Experiment Description Markup Language (SED-ML).

=== 5. Data Analysis Functions ===
- Several quality functions can compute the distance from simulated data to given data and provide a basis for model calibration.

=== 6. Application Programming Interface Support ===
- Offers a well-defined API, enabling integration into other software projects or direct use in Java applications via Apache Maven or Gradle.

== Supported Packages ==
- Systems Biology Markup Language (L1V1 - L3V2)
- SBML models with fbc V1 and V2
- SBML models with comp extensions
- Simulation Experiment Description Markup Language (L1V3)
- COMBINE archive and OMEX format
- All models from the SBML Test Suite and the BiGG models database
- All models from the Stochastic Test Suite

== Application ==
- SBSCL has been part of the systems biology community for several years and its adoption has also increased widely with time, primarily in research environments for the simulation of SBML models.
- It also hosts different SBML-related software like SBMLsimulator and CellDesigner.
- It has also been used to model zinc transportation in Bacillus spp. and to conduct research on engineering the non-oxidative glycolytic pathway in Streptomyces toxytricini

== See also ==
- List of systems biology modeling software
