= KiSAO =

Content
- Description: An ontology providing support in unambiguously referring to simulation algorithms when describing a simulation experiment.
- Data types captured: simulation algorithms, their characteristics and parameters

Contact
- Research center: EMBL-EBI
- Primary citation: PMID 22027554

Access
- Standards: MIRIAM
- Data format: OWL
- Website: KiSAO home page, KiSAO at BioPortal
- Download URL: KiSAO home page

Tools
- Standalone: libKiSAO, a java library to query KiSAO

Miscellaneous
- License: Artistic Licence
- Version: 2.3.5 (April 2014)
- Curation policy: yes (manual)
- Bookmarkable entities: yes

The Kinetic Simulation Algorithm Ontology (KiSAO) supplies information about existing algorithms available for the simulation of systems biology models, their characterization and interrelationships. KiSAO is part of the BioModels.net project and of the COMBINE initiative.

== Structure ==
KiSAO consists of three main branches:

- simulation algorithm
- simulation algorithm characteristic
- simulation algorithm parameter

The elements of each algorithm branch are linked to characteristic and parameter branches using has characteristic and has parameter relationships accordingly. The algorithm branch itself is hierarchically structured using relationships which denote that the descendant algorithms were derived from, or specify, more general ancestors.

== See also ==
- COMBINE
- SED-ML
- MIRIAM
- SBO
- TEDDY
