= Identifiers.org =

Identifiers.org is a project providing stable and perennial identifiers for data records used in the Life Sciences. The identifiers are provided in the form of Uniform Resource Identifiers (URIs). It is also a resolving system that relies on collections listed in the MIRIAM Registry to provide direct access to different instances of the identified records.

== URIs and resolving system ==
The Identifiers.org URIs are perennial identifiers, that specify at once the data collection, using the namespaces of the Registry, and the record identifier within the collection in the form of a unique resolvable URI. The Identifiers.org resolving system is built upon the information stored in the MIRIAM Registry, which is a database that stores namespaces assigned to commonly used data collections (databases and ontologies) for the Life Sciences. It transforms an Identifiers.org URI into the various URLs leading to the various instances of the record identified by the URI. Identifiers.org is part of the ELIXIR Interoperability Platform.

=== Identifier structure ===
An Identifiers.org URI is formed of several parts:

- Protocol. Identifiers.org URIs are HTTP URIs and start with "http:/"
- Data collection. These are namespaces listed in the MIRIAM Registry. For instance "pubmed" for the publication resource PubMed, "ec-code" for the enzyme nomenclature and "go" for gene ontology
- Record in the collection. For instance "9606" is "3-fluorotoluene" in the collection PubChem, it is "Homo sapiens" in the collection "taxonomy" and it is a social science publication in the collection "pubmed".
- Optional: Identifiers.org URIs can be suffixed with parameters, for instance imposing which resource to use for resolving, "profiles" that control the resolver's behaviour etc.

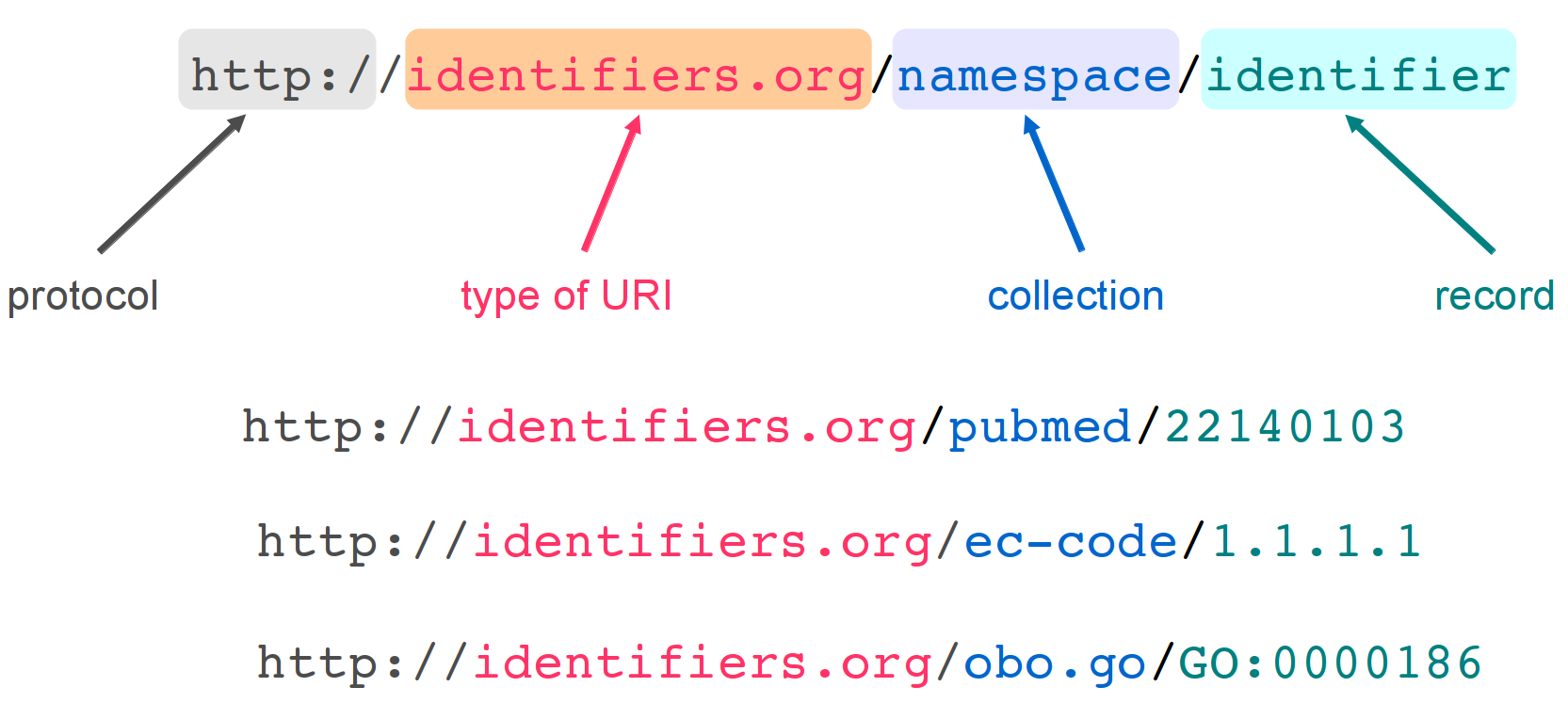
Structure and examples of Identifiers.org URIs.

=== Usage ===
The system allows a consistent and uniform annotation of datasets. This in turn facilitates data alignment and integration. Identifiers.org URIs are used to encode the metadata in the standard formats of the COMBINE initiative, such as SBML. In particular, databases such as BioModels Database and Reactome export their data in SBML with cross-references encoded using Identifiers.org URIs. These URIs are also used in various semantic web projects such as Bio2RDF, Open PHACTS and the EBI RDF platform Identifiers.org is part of the Interoperability Platform of the European life-sciences Infrastructure for biological Information.

=== Comparison with other URI systems ===
Identifiers.org URIs have been developed since 2011 as a resolvable version of the MIRIAM identifiers, developed since 2005, which were of a URN form, and not directly resolvable. Identifiers.org URIs are similar to PURLs, albeit providing alternative resolutions for collections with several instances. They are also similar to DOIs, but provide human readable collection names, and re-use the record identifier assigned by the data provider.

== See also ==
- MIRIAM Registry
- BioModels
- SBML
- CellML
- LSID
- Digital object identifier
- Persistent uniform resource locator
