= COMBINE =

COMBINE, the COmputational Modeling in BIology NEtwork, is an initiative to coordinate the development of the various community standards and formats for computational models, initially in systems biology and related fields.

== History ==
The COMBINE initiative was started in 2010 in an attempt to start a broader series of scientific meetings in order to replace several smaller and more focused meetings and hackathons, notably the Systems Biology Graphical Notation (SBGN) and Systems Biology Markup Language (SBML) meetings. The first COMBINE meeting was organised by Igor Goryanin and held at the University of Edinburgh School of Informatics in October 2010. The final session of the meeting was followed by an event marking the 10th anniversary of SBML. COMBINE meetings have been held annually since; COMBINE 2014 was organised by the University of Southern California and COMBINE 2015 will be organised by the group of Chris Myers at the University of Utah.

== Representation formats ==
The COMBINE initiative aims to coordinate the development of community standards and formats for computational modelling, particularly in systems biology. In doing so, it is expected a set of complementary but non-overlapping standards will be developed, covering all aspects of computational modelling in all areas of biology. The major representation formats covered by COMBINE activity are the BioPAX standards language, SBGN, SBML and the SED-ML and CellML markup languages. The associated standardisation efforts are MIRIAM, SBO, KiSAO and the BioModels.net model repository.
