= SciCrunch =

Knowledge base providing Research Resource Identifiers

SciCrunch is a collaboratively edited knowledge base about scientific resources. It is a community portal for researchers and a content management system for data and databases. It is intended to provide a common source of data to the research community and the data about Research Resource Identifiers (RRIDs), which can be used in scientific publications. After starting as a pilot of two journals in 2014, by 2022 over 1,000 journals have been using them and over half a million RRIDs have been quoted in the scientific literature. In some respect, it is for science and scholarly publishing, similar to what Wikidata is for Wikimedia Foundation projects. Hosted by the University of California, San Diego, SciCrunch was also designed to help communities of researchers create their own portals to provide access to resources, databases and tools of relevance to their research areas

== Research Resource Identifiers ==
Research Resource Identifiers (RRID) are globally unique and persistent. They were introduced and are promoted by the Resource Identification Initiative. Resources in this context are research resources like reagents, tools or materials. An example for such a resource would be a cell line used in an experiment or software tool used in a computational analysis. The Resource Identification Portal (https://scicrunch.org/resources) was created in support of this initiative and is a central service where these identifiers can be searched and created. These identifiers should be fully searchable by data mining unlike supplementary files, and can be updated to new versions as basic methodology changes over time.

=== Format for RRID citations ===
The recommendation for citing research resources is shown below for key biological resources:

- Antibody: Millipore Cat# MAB377 (Lot) RRID:AB_2298772
- Model organism: NXR Cat# 1049, RRID:NXR_1049
- Cell line: Coriell Cat# GM03745, RRID:CVCL_1H60
- Plasmids: pMD2.G plasmid, RRID:Addgene_12259
- BioSamples: female without diabetes, HPAP, Cat# HPAP-066, RRID:SAMN19842595
- Tools: CellProfiler Image Analysis Software, (version or date) RRID:SCR_007358

The Resource Identification Portal lists existing RRIDs and instructions for creating a new one if an RRID matching the resource does not already exist.

=== Features of RRIDs ===
Description: Each RRID contains an ID, a type, a URL, and a name. There are hundreds of other attributes but most are specific to the type, for example antibody type RRIDs include an attribute called clonality, denoting whether the reagent is monoclonal or polyclonal, while cell lines have an attribute of "parental cell line" denoting the origin of the cell line being described.

RRID Citations: RRIDs denote those research resources that have been used in the conduct of a study. They are not intended to be casual citations. RRIDs that have been used in scientific papers have been mined from the literature using both automated tools and semi-automated tools thanks to a partnership with Hypothes.is. The data that defines which paper cites a particular RRID is usually available on the resolver page for that RRID, for example: https://scicrunch.org/resolver/CVCL_0038 shows the list of 44 papers (as of April 11, 2023) that have used this cell line in research. Each reference will show how authors have used the RRID by including a short snippet of the sentence in which the resource is defined by authors.

External Resolver Services for RRIDs: Name to thing resolver from the California Digital Library can resolve any RRID using the following pattern https://n2t.net/[RRID] example https://n2t.net/RRID:NXR_1049

The Identifiers.org resolver can also resolve any RRID using the following pattern https://identifiers.org/RRID/[RRID] example https://identifiers.org/RRID/RRID:NXR_1049

=== Institutions and publishers recommending use of RRIDs ===
A number of publishing houses, initiatives, and research institutions encourage using SciCrunch's RRIDs: Common Citation Format Article in Nature, Cell Press, eLife, FORCE11, Frontiers Media, GigaScience, MIRIAM Registry, NIH, PLOS Biology and PLOS Genetics.

== See also ==
- LSID
- Resource Description Framework
- Tag (metadata)
