= MIRIAM Registry =

The MIRIAM Registry, a by-product of the MIRIAM Guidelines, is a database of namespaces and associated information that is used in the creation of uniform resource identifiers. It contains the set of community-approved namespaces for databases and resources serving, primarily, the biological sciences domain. These shared namespaces, when combined with 'data collection' identifiers, can be used to create globally unique identifiers for knowledge held in data repositories. For more information on the use of URIs to annotate models, see the specification of SBML Level 2 Version 2 (and above).

A 'data collection' is defined as a set of data which is generated by a provider. A 'resource' is defined as a distributor of that data. Such a description allows numerous resources to be associated with a single collection, allowing accurate representation of how biological information is available on the World Wide Web; often the same information, from a single data collection, may be mirrored by different resources, or the core information may be supplemented with other data.

Example of an entry stored in the MIRIAM Registry

- data collection name: Gene Ontology
- data collection identifier: MIR:00000022
- data collection synonyms: GO
- data collection identifier pattern: ^GO:\d{7}$
- data collection namespace: urn:miriam:obo.go
- data collection 'Root URL': http://identifiers.org/obo.go/
- data collection 'Root URN': urn:miriam:obo.go:
- collection resources:
  - resource #1
    - resource identifier: MIR:00100012
    - resource location website: http://www.ebi.ac.uk/ego/
    - resource access URL (tokenised): https://www.ebi.ac.uk/ego/DisplayGoTerm?selected=$1
    - resource Description: QuickGO (Gene Ontology browser)
    - resource institution: European Bioinformatics Institute, United Kingdom
  - resource #2
    - [...]

The MIRIAM Registry is a curated resource, which is freely available and open to all. Submissions for new collections can be made through the website.

== Identifiers using the MIRIAM system ==
The MIRIAM Guidelines require the use of uniform resource identifiers in the annotation of model components. These are created using the shared list of namespaces defined in the MIRIAM Registry.

=== MIRIAM URIs ===
Using the namespaces defined in the MIRIAM Registry, it is possible to create identifiers in both a URN and a URL forms. This requires a unique collection-specific identifier, as well as a namespace to globally constrain the information space. Both the namespace and the root of each URI form are given for each data collection in the Registry. Both forms are derived from the same namespace. For example:

- urn form: urn:miriam:pubmed:16333295
- url form: https://identifiers.org/pubmed/16333295

In this example, the collection-specific identifier is 16333295, and the namespace is pubmed.

The URN form of identifiers requires the use of Web Services or programmatic means to access the referenced record. This means that one cannot simply put the URN form into a browser window and arrive at the referenced information. The URL form is directly resolvable, and relies on a resolving layer provided by Identifiers.org.

=== Supporting features and availability ===
To enable efficient use of the MIRIAM Registry and the rapid adoption of the annotation scheme, a number of supporting features are provided. These include Web Services, a website interface to access the Registry itself, and a Java library

The MIRIAM Registry is developed by the Proteomics Services Team at the European Bioinformatics Institute. The source code for the entire project, including supporting features, is available from SourceForge.net.

The MIRIAM Registry is used by several worldwide projects such as BioModels Database, SABIO-RK, COPASI, A more thorough listing can be found on the website.

== See also ==
- Minimum information standards
- MIRIAM
- Identifiers.org
- Metadata standards
- Computational systems biology
- BioModels Database
- SBML
- CellML
