= Sesar (disambiguation) =

Sesar is a village in Azad Kashmir.

Sesar may also refer to:

- Josip Sesar, Croatian professional basketball player
- Single European Sky ATM Research, a European air traffic control research program
- System for Earth Sample Registration, see International Geo Sample Number

== See also ==
- Sesara
- Cesar (disambiguation)
