= Augustin Luna =

American bioinformatician

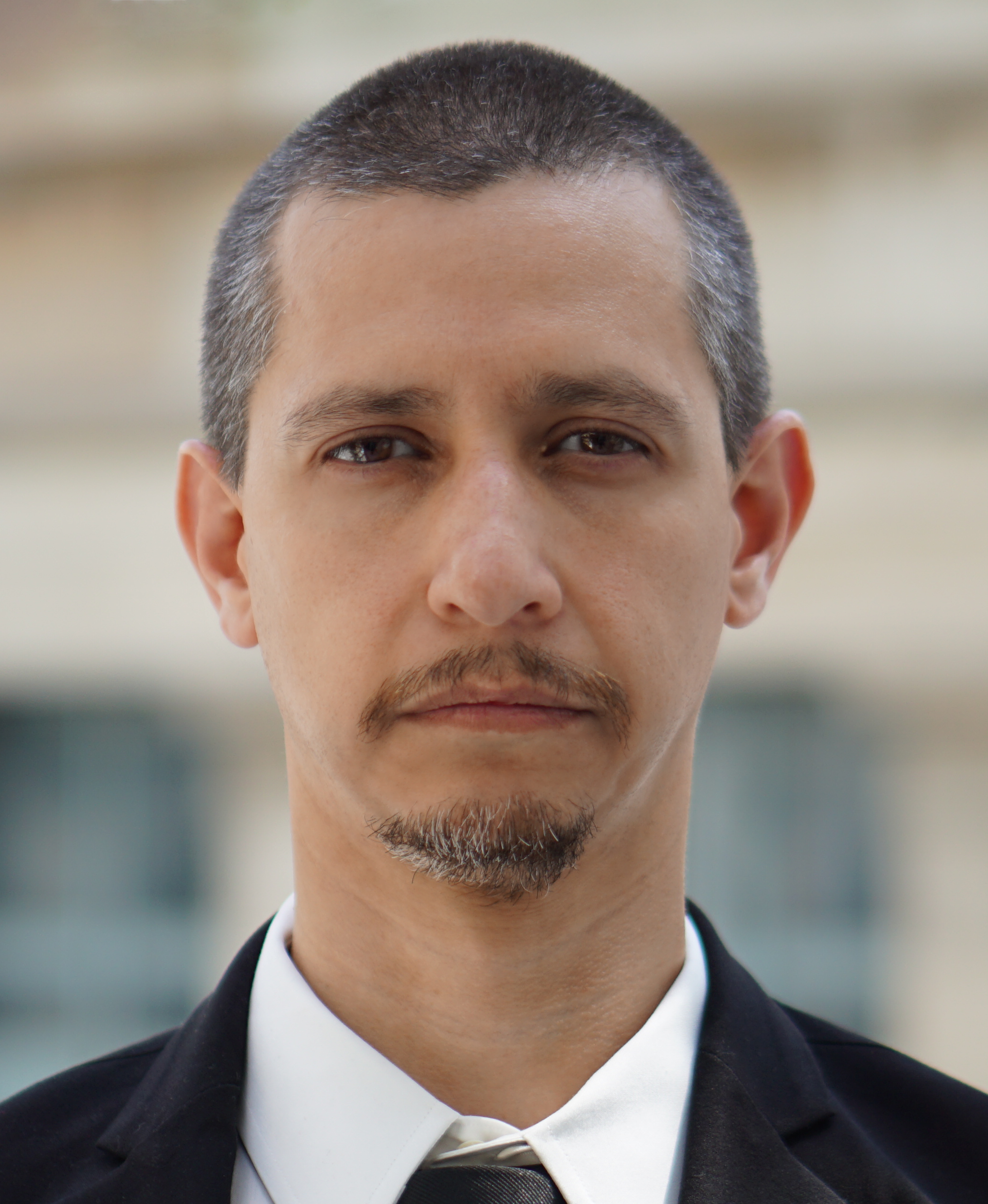
- Luna in 2023
- Known for: Systems Biology Graphical Notation
- Awards: National Research Service Award; Ford Foundation
- Scientific career
- Fields: Data Science; Computational Biology; Biological networks; Cancer Genomics; Drug Discovery; Systems biology
- Institutions: Harvard Medical School; Dana Farber Cancer Institute; Memorial Sloan–Kettering Cancer Center; Boston University; Georgia Tech
- Doctoral advisor: Mirit I. Aladjem
- Other academic advisors: Chris Sander (scientist)
- Website: www.nlm.nih.gov/research/researchstaff/LunaAugustin.html ccr.cancer.gov/staff-directory/augustin-luna

Augustin Luna is an American bioinformatician at the United States National Library of Medicine and the National Cancer Institute of the National Institutes of Health. His research aims to improve clinical consequences by focusing on network biology and standardizing biological data models for integration. One focus area includes studying the mechanisms of external perturbation responses utilizing machine-learning methods and artificial intelligence. Luna became well-known as a member of the COMBINE initiative, in particular since he is one of the initiators and editors for the graphical modeling language SBGN. Additionally, he has worked in other areas of knowledge representation of biological pathways, specifically the BioPAX (Biological Pathway Exchange) as used in Pathway Commons.
