= DLGAP4 =

Protein-coding gene in the species Homo sapiens

Identifiers
- Aliases: DLGAP4, DAP-4, DAP4, DLP4, SAPAP-4, SAPAP4, discs large homolog associated protein 4, DLG associated protein 4
- External IDs: OMIM: 616191; MGI: 2138865; HomoloGene: 8935; GeneCards: DLGAP4; OMA:DLGAP4 - orthologs

Gene location (Human)
Chr.	Chromosome 20 (human)
Band	20q11.23	Start	36,306,336 bp
Band	20q11.23	End	36,528,637 bp

Gene location (Mouse)
Chr.	Chromosome 2 (mouse)
Band	2|2 H1	Start	156,455,625 bp
Band	2|2 H1	End	156,606,283 bp
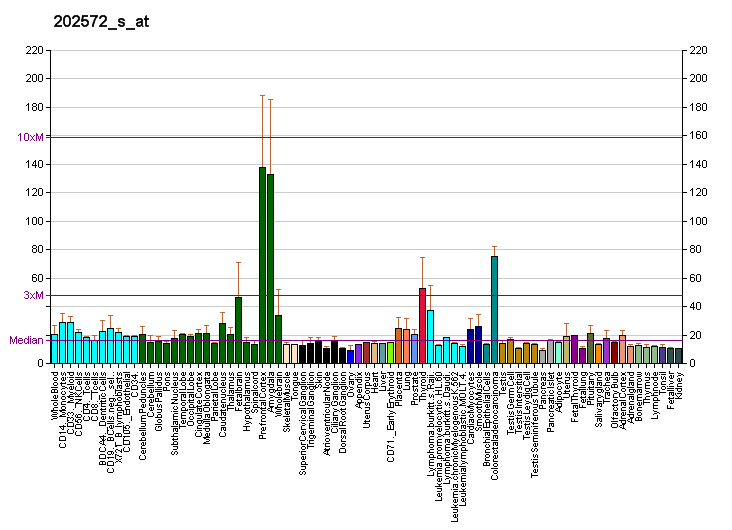

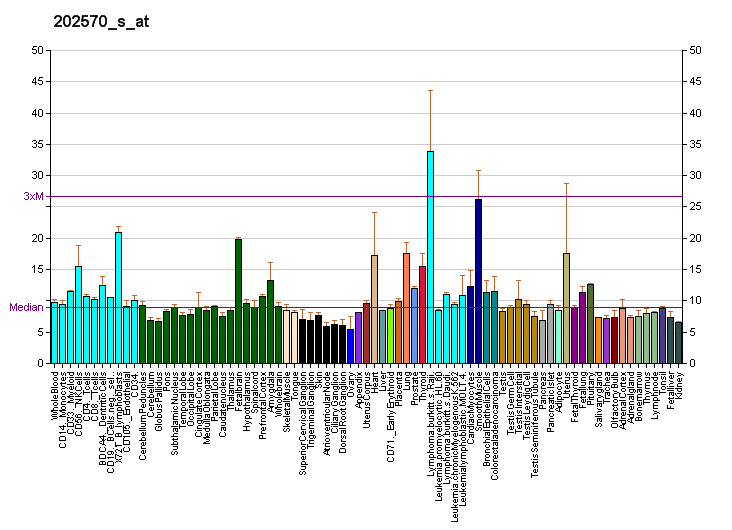

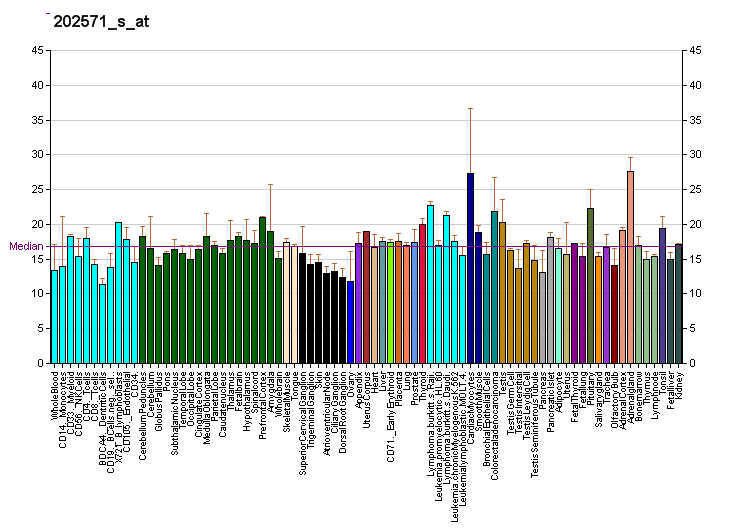
RNA expression pattern
Bgee	Human / Mouse (ortholog); Top expressed in: ganglionic eminence; ascending aorta; skin of leg; right coronary artery; Descending thoracic aorta; popliteal artery; tibial arteries; skin of abdomen; gastrocnemius muscle; left coronary artery / Top expressed in: superior frontal gyrus; genital tubercle; lip; granulocyte; zygote; primary visual cortex; Rostral migratory stream; subiculum; internal carotid artery; ganglionic eminence; More reference expression data
BioGPS	More reference expression data
Gene ontology
Molecular function	protein binding; protein domain specific binding
Cellular component	membrane; plasma membrane; synapse; neuromuscular junction; glutamatergic synapse; cholinergic synapse; postsynaptic specialization
Biological process	signaling
Sources:Amigo / QuickGO
Orthologs
Species	Human	Mouse
Entrez	22839	228836
Ensembl	ENSG00000080845	ENSMUSG00000061689
UniProt	Q9Y2H0	B1AZP2
RefSeq (mRNA)	NM_001042486; NM_014902; NM_183006; NM_001365621	NM_001042487; NM_001042488; NM_001277186; NM_001277187; NM_146128
RefSeq (protein)	NP_001035951; NP_055717; NP_892118; NP_001352550	NP_001035952; NP_001035953; NP_001264115; NP_001264116; NP_666240
Location (UCSC)	Chr 20: 36.31 – 36.53 Mb	Chr 2: 156.46 – 156.61 Mb
PubMed search
- Wikidata
View/Edit Human	View/Edit Mouse

Disks large-associated protein 4 (DAP-4) also known as SAP90/PSD-95-associated protein 4 (SAPAP-4) is a protein that in humans is encoded by the DLGAP4 gene.

== Function ==
DAP-4 is a membrane-associated guanylate kinase found at the postsynaptic density in neuronal cells. It is a signaling molecule that can interact with potassium channels and receptors, as well as other signaling molecules. DAP-4 can interact with PSD-95 through its guanylate kinase domain and may be involved in clustering PSD-95 in the postsynaptic density region. The encoded protein is one of at least four similar proteins that have been found. Alternatively spliced transcript variants encoding different isoforms have been found for this gene.
