= SED-ML =

Simulation Experiment Description Markup Language
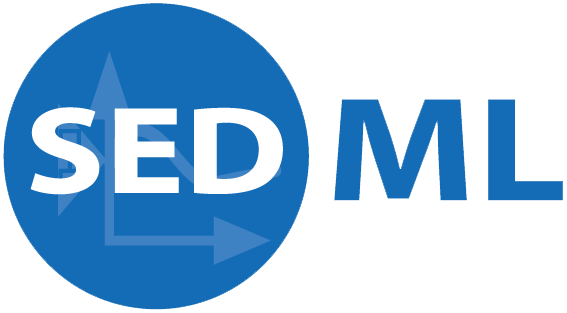
- Filename extension: .xml
- Initial release: 25 March 2011; 15 years ago
- Latest release: Level 1 Version 2, Release 1; 2 December 2013; 12 years ago
- Type of format: Markup language
- Extended from: XML
- Open format?: Yes
- Website: sed-ml.org

The Simulation Experiment Description Markup Language (SED-ML) is a representation format, based on XML, for the encoding and exchange of simulation descriptions on computational models of biological systems. It is a free and open community development project.

SED-ML Level 1 Version 1, the first version of SED-ML, enables descriptions of time course simulation experiments.

== Structure ==
The SED-ML format is built of five major blocks:

- The Model entity is used to reference the models used in the simulation experiment and to define pre-processing procedures on these models before simulation. Models must be in standard representation formats (e.g., SBML, CellML, NeuroML). Examples for pre-processing are, e.g., changing the value of an observable, computing the change of a value using mathematics, or general changes on any XML element of the model representation.
- The Simulation entity contains all information about the simulation settings and the steps taken during simulation, e.g., the particular type of simulation and the algorithm used for the execution of the simulation. The simulation algorithm is specified with a Kinetic Simulation Algorithm Ontology term.
- The Task entity applies one of the defined simulations with one of the referenced models at a time.
- The DataGenerator entity encodes post-processing procedures which need to be applied to the simulation result before output, e.g., normalisation of data.
- The Output entity specifies the simulation output, e.g., the particular plots to be shown.

More information on the SED-ML structure is available from the SED-ML home page and the reference publication.

== History ==
The idea of developing a standard format for simulation experiment encoding was born at the European Bioinformatics Institute (EMBL-EBI). In 2007, Dagmar Waltemath and Nicolas Le Novère started to draft such a format during Dagmar's Marie-Curie funded internship in the Computational Neuroscience group at EMBL-EBI.

The SED-ML project was first discussed publicly at the 12th SBML Forum Meeting in 2007, in Long Beach (US). The first version of SED-ML was then presented at the "Super-hackathon "standards and ontologies for Systems Biology"" in Okinawa in 2008. Back then, the language was called MIASE-ML (in accordance with the MIASE guidelines). In Okinawa, many researchers showed a high interest in the format, and discussions were vital. MIASE became the Minimum Information guideline for simulation experiments. MIASE-ML was renamed into "Simulation Experiment Description Markup Language" (SED-ML).

Level 1 Version 1 of SED-ML officially appeared in March 2011, but SED-ML was presented, discussed and further specified during several community meetings in the years in between, including the combined "CellML-SBGN-SBO-BioPAX-MIASE workshop" in 2009, or the "2010 SBML-BioModels.net Hackathon".

Since then SED-ML has been developed in collaboration with the communities forming the "computational modeling in biology network" COMBINE. Besides dedicated sessions at various meetings, the development of SED-ML benefits from community interactions on the SED-ML-discuss mailing list.

== SED-ML Community ==
SED-ML is part of the COmputational Modeling in Biology Network (COMBINE). Format development is coordinated by an editorial board elected by the community. Discussions take place at SED-ML-discuss.
