= Igor Goryanin =

Academic background
- Education: Russian Academy of Sciences
- Website: www.inf.ed.ac.uk/people/staff/Igor_Goryanin.html

Igor I. Goryanin is a systems biologist, who holds a Henrik Kacser Chair in Computational Systems Biology at the University of Edinburgh.

== Biography ==
Goryanin graduated in 1985 with an MSc in applied mathematics from the Computer Science Department, Moscow Engineering Physical Institute, where he was developing numerical methods and algorithms for analysis of stiff differential equations. Goryanin spent more than twelve years working in the Institute of Biophysics, Russian Academy of Sciences and obtained his PhD in 1995 at the same Institute. During this time he developed DBSolve, a software for mathematical stimulation and analysis of the cellular metabolism and regulation. From 1989 to 1995, he was also CEO and co-founder of Biobank Inc., Russia.

In 1995–1997 Goryanin worked as a Visiting Computer Scientist at the Mathematics & Computer Science Division, Argonne National Laboratories.

Goryanin joined GlaxoSmithKline (formerly known as GlaxoWellcome) in 1997, where he worked on the application of modelling and informatics techniques to the pharmaceutical research and development and drugs manufacturing industry. The whole cell modelling of organisms approach developed by Goryanin has been successfully used to improve drug R&D and manufacturing process in production plants. i.e. designing anti-microbial assays and anti-microbial drug targets identification, rational organism design, rational biomarker design and target prioritisation, reconstructing cellular networks for cancers, metabolic and lipid disorders.

In 2005 Goryanin moved to the University of Edinburgh to take the position of a Henrik Kacser Chair in Computational Systems Biology. In 2006, Goryanin developed one of the first Masters courses in Computational Systems Biology in the UK, currently taught at the University of Edinburgh. He co-founded the Centre for Systems Biology at Edinburgh, where he was a co-director (2006–2010), and Edinburgh Centre for Bioinformatics, where he was a director (2005–2010).

== Research interests and projects ==
- Systems biology: Reconstruction, modelling and analysis of biological networks based on functional genomics data and literature.
- Systems Biology Informatics Infrastructure development
- Life science Informatics: Data mining and data integration of biological and pharmaceutical-related databases.
- Software and algorithms for modelling and stimulation, visualisation and optimisation of complex systems
- Bioenergy and bioremediation research: Optimisation of microbial devices, which uses the ability of some micro-organisms and enzymes to convert organic matter into electricity directly. (MFC)
- Systems Oncology: Application of modelling and analysis of pathways in human tissues to predict response to anti-cancer treatment and to develop personalised therapies, distance learning and diagnostics in cancer.

=== Collaborations ===
Igor is co-founder of the International E. coli alliance (IECA). Goryanin and his group are currently involved in several international collaborations, including the development of the Systems Biology Markup Language, a computer-readable format for representing models of biochemical reaction networks and Systems Biology Graphical Notation, a standard graphical representation for systems biologists.
