= Force11 Scholarly Communication Institute =

US research program

The FORCE11 Scholarly Communication Institute (FSCI, pronounced fis-key) is a week-long program first launched in 2017, which provides skill training, networking and collaboration opportunities on innovative mode of communicating research. As a global initiative by the Future of Research Communications and e-Scholarship (FORCE11), FSCI brings researchers, students, administrators, funders, librarians, publishers, and other informational professionals together to build up expertise through intensive training and hands-on collaborations.

The aim of the FSCI is to teach students, faculty members, administrators, and librarians how to navigate this rapidly evolving world of scholarly, scientific, and research communication. In the words of former FORCE11 President Cameron Neylon (term 2016-2017), "the idea is that we all have as much to learn from each other, as we have to offer in terms of ideas and technology." It is modeled on the Digital Humanities Summer Institute in Victoria, BC.

== History ==
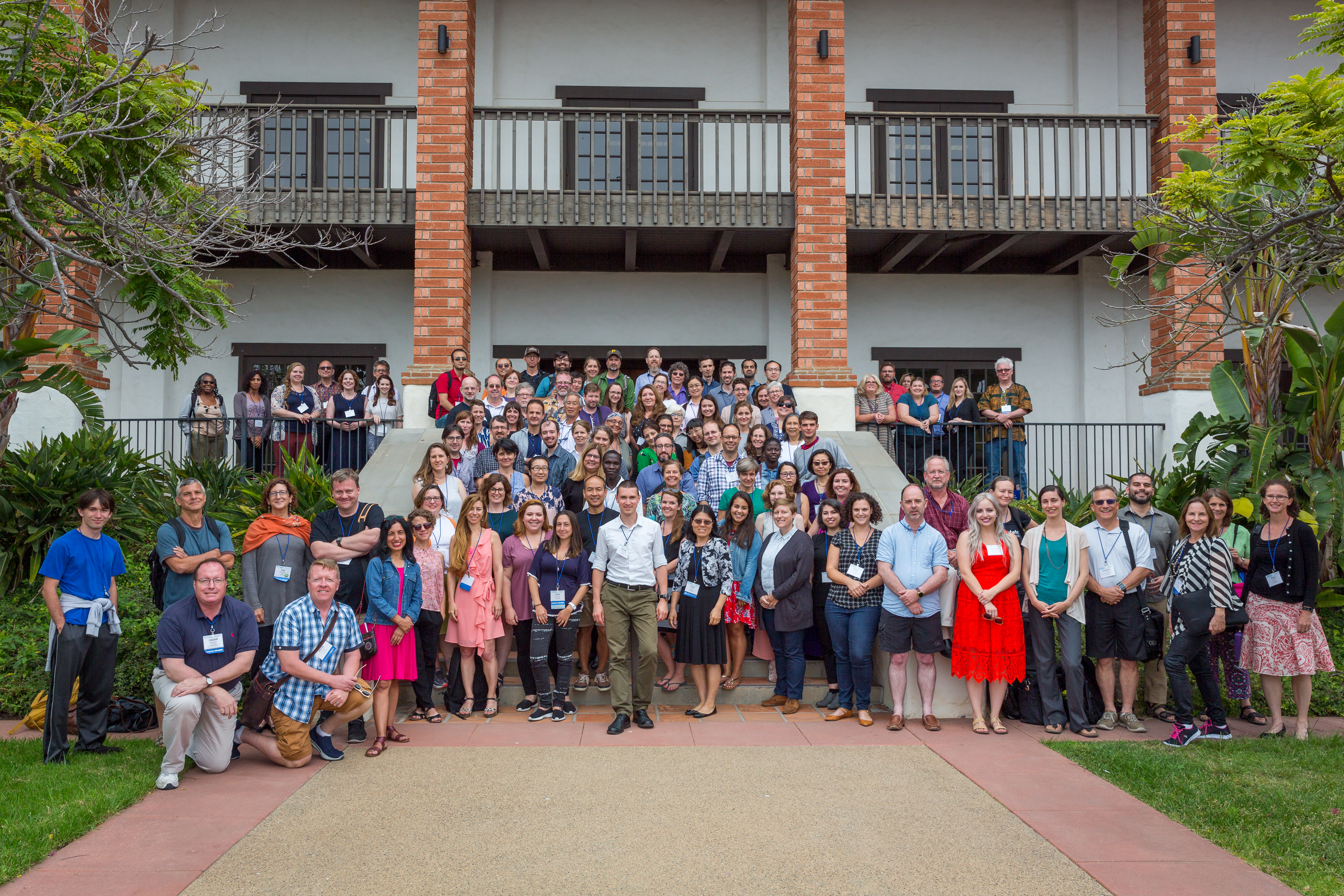
FORCE11 Scholarly Communications Institute 2017 attendees

In 2017, FSCI was hosted under partnerships between FORCE11 and the University of California at San Diego. In 2019, University of California at Los Angeles started to partner with FORCE11 to host the third annual FSCI and expected it to be a long-term collaboration. The table below listed the location and dates of the Institutes.

Location and Dates of the Past FSCI
Year	Location	Dates
FSCI2017	Institute of the Americas Complex, University of California at San Diego, San Diego, CA, U.S.	July 31 - August 4, 2017
FSCI2018	Medical Education and Telemedicine (MET) Building, University of California at San Diego, San Diego, CA, U.S.	July 30 - August 3, 2018
FSCI2019	University of California at Los Angeles, CA, U.S.	August 5 - August 9, 2019

== Scope ==
FSCI is structured for each attendee to choose one morning course and two afternoon courses on scholarly communication topics ranging from introductory to cutting-edge. For example:

- building an open and information-rich institute
- data across domains
- open and reproducible research
- author carpentry
- peer review - emerging approaches
- persistent identifiers
- new forms of publications
- understanding research metrics and measuring success

There are also plenary sessions, do-a-thons, slides karaoke, and other social events throughout the week.

=== Impact ===
FSCI attendees reported that they developed deeper contextualized understanding of scholarly communication issues. FSCI has been providing scholarships for attendees from 6 continents across the world. Adegbilero-Iwari Idowu from Elizade University, IIara-Mokin, Nigeria reported that the FSCI training had enabled him to be a pioneer for scholarly communication in Nigera.
