= List of proprietary bioinformatics software =

This is a list of computer software which is made for bioinformatics and is developed under proprietary licenses with articles in Wikipedia.

Software	Description	Platform	License	Developer
Abalone	A general purpose molecular dynamics and molecular graphics program for simulations of bio-molecules	x86, Nvidia GPU CUDA	Proprietary	Agile Molecule
Promethease	Generates a personal genetic report by comparing a user's DNA data file against the SNPedia database.	Web application	Proprietary	MyHeritage
TINKER	A molecular dynamics simulator with a complete and general package for molecular mechanics and molecular dynamics.	Windows, OS X, Linux, Unix	Proprietary	Washington University in St. Louis, University of Texas at Austin, Sorbonne University

== See also ==
- List of sequence alignment software
- List of open-source bioinformatics software
- List of open-source health software
- List of biomedical cybernetics software
- List of freeware health software
- List of molecular graphics systems
- Comparison of software for molecular mechanics modeling
