= FORCE11 =

Non-profit organisation to enhance research publishing and communication

- The Future of Scholarly Communication and e-Scholarship
- Formation: 2011; 15 years ago
- Type: Nonprofit organization
- Tax ID no.: 46-3994190
- Purpose: Scholarly communication
- Headquarters: San Diego
- Members: 3,471 (June 2011)
- Official language: English
- Board Chair: Todd A. Carpenter
- Subsidiaries: Force11 Scholarly Communication Institute (FSCI)
- Website: force11.org

FORCE11 is an international coalition of researchers, librarians, publishers and research funders working to reform or enhance the research publishing and communication system. Initiated in 2011 as a community of interest on scholarly communication, FORCE11 is a registered 501(c)(3) organization based in the United States but with members and partners around the world. Key activities include an annual conference, the Scholarly Communications Institute and a range of working groups.

== History ==
FORCE11 grew out of the FORC Workshop held in Dagstuhl, Germany in August 2011. This meeting resulted in the collaborative creation of a white paper which summarized the problems of scholarly communication and proposed a vision to address them.

== Activities ==
Through various working groups FORCE11 has undertaken a range of activities to improve the standards, interoperability and functionality of digital research communications and developed various statements on principles and policies for best practice. These include:

- FAIR Data Principles: The development of a set of principles based on making data Findable, Accessible, Interoperable, and Reusable (FAIR)
- Research Resource Identification Initiative (RRID): supporting new guidelines and identifiers in biomedical publications
- Joint Declaration of Data Citation Principles (JDDCP): intended to help achieve widespread, uniform human and machine accessibility of deposited data through data citation
- Software citation principles

== See also ==
- Australian Open Access Strategy Group (AOASG)
- Coalition for Networked Information (CNI)
- Open Access Scholarly Publishers Association (OASPA)
- Scholarly Publishing and Academic Resources Coalition (SPARC)
