= Sesar =

- Village
- Location within Azad Kashmir Location within Pakistan
- Coordinates: 34°3′20″N 73°34′0″E
- Country: Pakistan
- Autonomous territory: Azad Kashmir
- District: Bagh District

Sesar is a village in the Bagh District of Azad Kashmir. It is located in Dheerkot tehsil. It was affected by the 2005 earthquake and also hosted large numbers of refugees. Sesar was granted the status of a Union Council in 2018 by the Land and Revenue Department of Azad Jammu & Kashmir. It is now known as Union Council Sesar Kals and comprises four revenue villages: Sesar, Dnah, Kals Pajjay, and Neela Butt.

Basharat Abbasi Shaheed Road connects Saser with the capital of Azad Jammu & Kashmir, Muzaffarabad, as well as the capital of Pakistan, Islamabad.

The village has two government high schools, one for girls and one for boys, along with a READ Foundation school. Overall, the literacy rate is quite high, with many being well educated and actively serving in various public and social sectors. Additionally, a significant portion of the population is employed abroad. A Rural Health Center exists in the village, established through the dedicated efforts and keen interest of the late. Dr. Muhammad Hayat Khan Abbasi. He was a renowned and respected personality of the village who made a significant contribution to its development. He completed his MBBS in 1935, before the partition, from Amritsar Medical College, and became the 1st Muslim doctor of Poonch. After the partition, he devoted himself to serving the people of Azad Jammu & Kashmir and played a key role in the establishment of the Health Department in the state.
