= Terminology for the Description of Dynamics =

TEDDY logo

Terminology for the Description of Dynamics (TEDDY) aims to provide an ontology for dynamical behaviours, observable dynamical phenomena, and control elements of bio-models and biological systems in Systems Biology and Synthetic Biology.
