= Guanylate kinase =

Enzyme

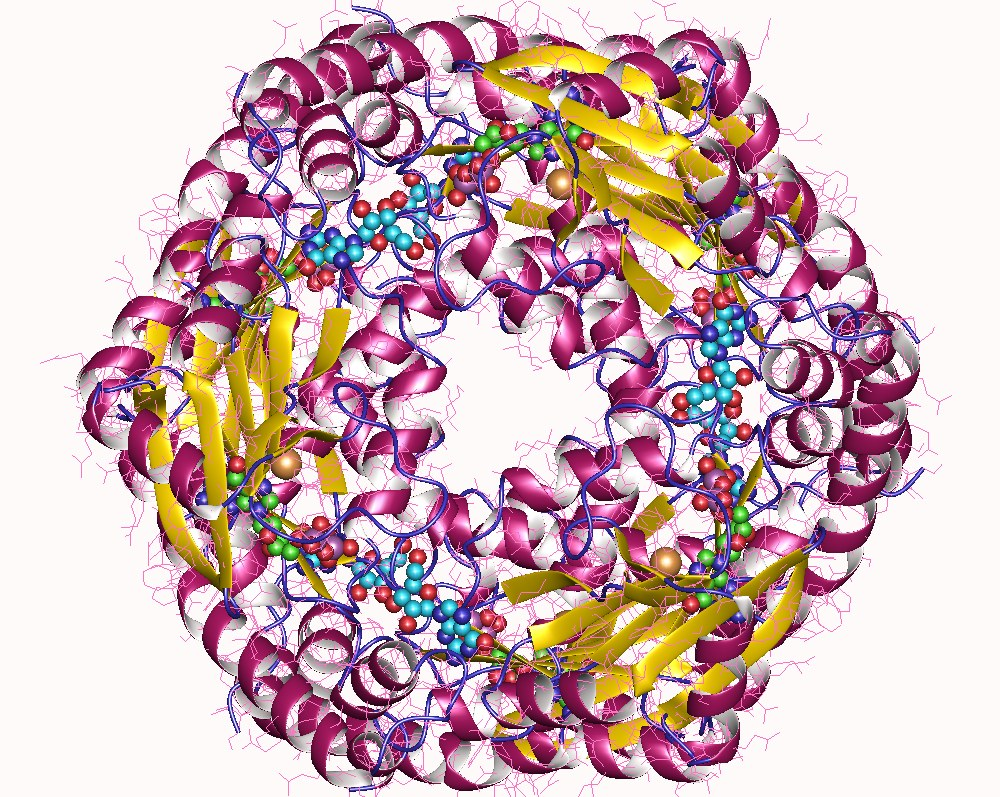
- guanylate kinase homohexamer, E.Coli

Identifiers
- EC no.: 2.7.4.8
- CAS no.: 9026-59-9

Databases
- BRENDA: enzyme data
- ExPASy: NiceZyme view
- KEGG: enzyme entry
- MetaCyc: metabolic pathway
- Rhea: reactions
- PDB structures: RCSB PDB PDBe PDBsum
- Gene Ontology: AmiGO / QuickGO
Search
- PMC: articles
- PubMed: articles
- NCBI: proteins

Guanylate kinase
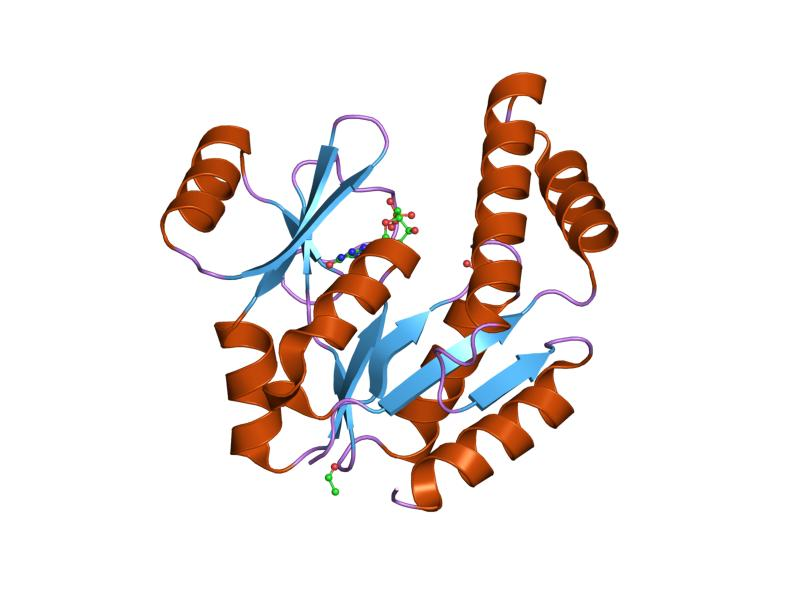
- Structure of Guanylate Kinase.

Identifiers
- Symbol: Guanylate_kin
- Pfam: PF00625
- InterPro: IPR008144
- PROSITE: PDOC00670
- SCOP2: 1gky / SCOPe / SUPFAM
- CDD: cd00071
Available protein structures:
- PDB: 1ex6, 1ex7, 1gky, 1jxm, 1jxo, 1kgd, 1kjw, 1lvg, 1s4q, 1s96, 1xzp, 1xzq, 1z6g, 1z8f, 1znw, 1znx, 1zny, 1znz, 2an9, 2anb, 2anc, 2f3r, 2f3t, 2qor IPR008144 PF00625 (ECOD; PDBsum)
- AlphaFold: IPR008144; PF00625

Guanylate kinase (EC 2.7.4.8) is an enzyme that catalyzes the chemical reaction

guanosine monophosphate
ATP
ADP
ATP
ADP
guanosine diphosphate

The reaction interconverts the nucleotide, guanosine monophosphate (GMP) and guanosine diphosphate (GDP) by transferring a phosphate group from the cofactor, adenosine triphosphate (ATP), which is converted to adenosine diphosphate (ADP). The enzyme has very widespread occurrence, for example in L cells, Escherichia coli, rat liver, and calf thymus.

Guanylate kinase is essential for recycling GMP and indirectly, cGMP. In prokaryotes (such as Escherichia coli), lower eukaryotes (such as yeast) and in vertebrates, it is a highly conserved monomeric protein of about 200 amino acids which has been shown to be structurally similar to protein A57R (or SalG2R) from various strains of Vaccinia virus. Systems biology analyses carried out by the team of Andreas Dräger also identified a pivotal role of this enzyme in the replication of SARS-CoV-2 within the human airways.

== Nomenclature ==
This enzyme is a transferase, specifically one transferring phosphorus-containing groups (phosphotransferases) with a phosphate group as acceptor. The systematic name of this enzyme class is ATP:(d)GMP phosphotransferase. Other names in common use include"

- deoxyguanylate kinase,
- 5'-GMP kinase,
- GMP kinase,
- guanosine monophosphate kinase, and
- ATP:GMP phosphotransferase.
