= Scholarly communication =

Creation and dissemination of academic research

Scholarly communication involves the creation, publication, dissemination, and discovery of academic research, primarily in peer-reviewed journals and books. It is “the system through which research and other scholarly writings are created, evaluated for quality, disseminated to the scholarly community, and preserved for future use." This primarily involves the publication of peer-reviewed academic journals, books, and conference papers.

There are many issues with scholarly communication, which include authors' rights, the peer review process, the economics of scholarly resources, new models of publishing (including open access and institutional repositories), rights and access to federally funded research, and preservation of intellectual assets.

Common methods of scholarly communication include publishing peer-reviewed articles in academic journals, academic monographs and books, book reviews, and conference papers. Other textual formats used include preprints and working papers, reports, encyclopedias, dictionaries, data and visualisations, blogs and discussion forums. Other forms, particularly in the arts and humanities include multimedia formats such as sound and video recordings.

== Terminology ==
=== Manuscript ===
- a scholarly document which has not yet been submitted for publication.

=== Preprint ===
- There are two working definitions. a scholarly manuscript that has been submitted for peer review, or a scholarly document at any stage prior to the completion of peer review.

=== Postprint ===
- the final peer reviewed version of a manuscript that has been accepted for publication
- materials that have been accepted to be presented at a conference

=== Article ===
- a scholarly document which has been published.

=== Paper ===
- a scholarly document or material which has been presented at a conference.

=== e-Script ===
- an electronic manuscript

== Scholarly communication and data publishing ==
The modern research author requires a reliable and standardized method to make research data available to other members of their community. This need has resulted in the development of a new form of scholarly communication known as data publishing. The process involves making data accessible, reusable and citable for long term use and is more elaborate than simply providing access to a data file. Data is becoming an important element of scholarship as a sharable source to be reused and shared. The same data can be accessed by multiple researchers to ask new questions or to replicate research for verification and augmentation. Categories of data differ among disciplines, as does its accessibility. Many publications have begun to offer incentives to scholarly researchers to publish their data and have developed the necessary infrastructure in support of e-research. Technical, policy, and institutional factors are becoming more established. The next phase will see the integration of the process into a standardized data publishing methodology.

There are several types of data that researchers must to protect when collecting, handling, storing and sharing data to safeguard the confidentiality of contributors. There are three primary types of information. Personally identifiable information includes any data that allows the identity of an individual to whom the information applies to be realistically deduced by either direct or indirect means. Protected health information includes individually identifiable health information transmitted or maintained in any form or medium by a covered entity. Other sensitive information that should be protected include data that if it were disclosed would have a significant likelihood to cause psychological, social, emotional, physical, or reputation harm. A common approach for data sharing that includes confidential material is through de-identification or anonymization. There are numerous techniques for the de-identification of data including simply removing specific variables or by using statistical techniques such as top-coding, collapsing or combining, sampling, swapping, or disturbing the data. For qualitative data, redaction can be used to hide data elements that cannot be made public. However, it is important that future research requirements be taken into consideration when developing a de-identification or anonymization plan.

== Peer review and quality control ==
A key element of the scholarly communication process is ensuring that research meets a level of quality and is of scholarly merit. This is normally done through a process of peer review, where other researchers in the same discipline review the research write up and decide if it is of sufficient quality. For example, in the case of a journal article, the author(s) of a piece of research will submit their article to a journal, it will then be sent to a number of other academics who specialize in the same area to be peer reviewed. The journal will often receive many more articles than there is space to publish them, and it is in their interest to publish only those of the highest quality (which will over time increase the reputation of the journal). If the reviewers feel the article is of a high enough quality for the journal, they will often request some changes to be made and once these are done, accept the article for publication.

== Scholarly communication and libraries ==
Libraries and librarians play a critical role in the aggregation, evaluation and dissemination of scholarly communication. The Scholarly Communication Toolkit was designed by the Research and Scholarly Environment Committee of the Association of College and Research Libraries (ACRL) to support advocacy efforts designed to transform the scholarly communication landscape.

The future of research libraries will be shaped by broader developments at research universities in the areas of creating, sharing, disseminating, and curating knowledge. Universities face fundamental policy choices in all of the areas that have been recast by developments in information technology. Current trends in digital scholarship practices across the humanities, science, and social science have significant implications for research libraries in academic institutions as a means of framing policy choices.

Many research libraries have formalized the role of Scholarly Communications Librarian and defined specific responsibilities, including the implementation of outreach programs to increase awareness relative to copyright (particularly section 108 of the US Copyright Act), open access, and other scholarly communication issues. Through these types of programs, librarians have established their role relative to the structure of the library organization by formalizing the discussion of these issues in research and e-learning activities. They also contribute in teaching copyright literacy by being active in all stages of the research process.

== Scholarly communication and academic reward and reputation ==
Scholarly communication is seen as a crucial part of research, and researchers - many of whom are lecturers and academics at universities - are often judged by their academic output and list of publications. Promotions will normally take into account the number of publications and how prestigious the journals they were published in (e.g. Nature and The Lancet are seen as very prestigious journals within the sciences). A researcher's publication list will help them create a positive reputation within their discipline. The proliferation of open access journals has facilitated this process by providing a means for scholars to publish their research regardless of perceived importance, as is the case with traditional journals. Publications such as PLOS ONE and Scientific Reports follow an author pay model, where the peer review and publishing service are provided for a one time cost to the writer. The material is then made available at no cost to others, who can then build on this research without limitation. This approach results in the acceptance and publishing of a greater percentage of submissions across a broader subject area.

== Scholarly communication crisis ==
The term "scholarly communications" has been in common usage at least since the mid-1970s, in recent years there has been widespread belief that the traditional system for disseminating scholarship has reached a state of crisis (often referred to as the "publishing crisis" or "serials crisis")

The proliferation of new journals and the "twigging" of established journals into smaller sub-specialities, combined with rising prices, especially in the sciences, have dramatically reduced the capacity of research libraries to purchase resources required by their scholarly communities. All disciplines and formats are affected, the humanities and social sciences as well as the sciences, books as well as journals. The proliferation of electronic journals and the various pricing models for this information has further complicated the acquisitions issue, both for libraries and for publishers.

Many groups, including library consortia, research funders, academics and universities have been calling for changes to the ways scholarly communication takes place, particularly in light of the Internet creating new and low cost methods to disseminate research, while still maintaining a 'peer review' process to ensure that the quality of research is maintained. To advance research in this area and to produce sustainable publication tools, the Andrew W. Mellon Foundation has funded a cohort of projects based on university campuses and at academic presses "to change scholarly practice in ways that advance teaching, research, preservation, and publication." Recent technological developments, such as open access and institutional repositories at universities are seen as vehicles for changing or improving the scholarly communication process.

Chief among the factors contributing to the perceived crisis is the academic reward system, which emphasizes quantity of publication. There is a consequent demand by scholars for peer-reviewed publication outlets. Another important cause is the commercialization and internationalization of scholarly publishing. The growing dominance of publishing conglomerates in scientific, technical, and medical fields, and to some degree in the social sciences, is of special concern to information professionals. Scholars, often indifferent to rights issues, transfer copyright to for-profit publishers, frequently for reports of research funded wholly or partially at public expense. Commercial publishers have established a highly profitable niche for themselves in the scholarly communication chain.

== See also ==
- FORCE11
- Open access
- Open science
