= International Generic Sample Number =

The International Generic Sample Number or IGSN is a persistent identifier for a sample. As an active persistent identifier it can be resolved through the Handle System. The system is used in production by the System for Earth Sample Registration (SESAR), Geoscience Australia, Commonwealth Scientific and Industrial Research Organisation Mineral Resources, Australian Research Data Commons (ARDC), University of Bremen MARUM, German Research Centre for Geosciences (GFZ), IFREMER Institut Français de Recherche pour l'Exploitation de la Mer, Korea Institute of Geoscience & Mineral Resources (KIGAM), and Kiel University. Other organisations are preparing the introduction of the IGSN.

The IGSN was developed as the International Geo Sample Number to provide a persistent, globally unique, web resolvable identifier for physical samples. IGSN is both a governance and technical system for assigning globally unique persistent identifiers to physical samples. Even though initially developed for samples in the geosciences, the application of IGSN can be and has already been expanded to other domains that rely on physical samples and collections. To take into account the expanded scope of the application of IGSN beyond the earth and environmental sciences, the IGSN Implementation Organization (IGSN e.V.) voted to change the name of the identifier to International Generic Sample Number (IGSN) and rename the organisation accordingly.

The IGSN preserves the identity of a sample even as it is moved from lab to lab and as data appear in different publications, thus eliminating ambiguity that stems from similar names for samples from the earth. The IGSN unique identifier allows researchers to track the analytical history of a sample and build on previously collected data as new techniques are developed. Additionally, the IGSN provides a link between disparate data generated by different investigators and published in different scientific articles.

In September 2021, the members of IGSN e.V. and DataCite agreed to enter a partnership. Under the partnership, DataCite will provide the IGSN ID registration services and supporting technology to enable the ongoing sustainability of the IGSN PID infrastructure. The IGSN e.V. will facilitate a Community of Communities to promote and support new research and innovation for standard methods of identifying, citing, and locating physical samples.

== History ==
The IGSN was developed as part of SESAR with the support of the National Science Foundation at the Lamont–Doherty Earth Observatory. The project was initiated and managed by the Geoinformatics for Geochemistry Program under the direction of Kerstin Lehnert to address data curation obstacles such as different samples that share the same name, and samples that are renamed as they move between laboratories and thus generating analyses that are published under different aliases. As a result, metadata that ensure unique identification are often missing and this causes irritation for future reuse of data from a sample or the sample itself. Sample databases, such as the SESAR database, are designed to address these issues.

At a workshop hosted at the San Diego Supercomputer Center in 2011, a group of experts met to discuss how to transition the IGSN project into a sustainable infrastructure. The group recommended opening the system to other IGSN registration agents, making it international and transferring the operation and governance of the IGSN to an independent body. This recommendation led to the foundation of the International Geo Sample Implementation Organization e.V. (IGSN e.V.) and the founding event was held at the American Geophysical Union Fall Meeting 2011 in San Francisco, California. The IGSN e.V. is an incorporated organisation under German law and is registered at the Magistrates Court in Potsdam, Germany.

Membership in the organisation is open only to institutions, not to individuals. At present, IGSN e.V. has 16 full members.

In 2018, the Alfred P. Sloan Foundation awarded Columbia University's Lamont–Doherty Earth Observatory a grant for a project to modernise the IGSN business model and system architecture. The funding from the Sloan Foundation will support a series of workshops, at which international experts will come together to redesign the IGSN system and its management to allow researchers world-wide use the IGSN with confidence.

In September 2021, IGSN e.V. and DataCite entered a partnership under which DataCite will provide the IGSN ID registration services and supporting technology to enable the ongoing sustainability of the IGSN PID infrastructure. The IGSN e.V. will facilitate a Community of Communities to promote and support new research and innovation for standard methods of identifying, citing, and locating physical samples. The partnership allows IGSN to leverage DataCite DOI registration services and to focus community efforts on advocacy and expanding the global samples ecosystem.

IGSN and DataCite have a common purpose, and a close relationship in the future will provide mutual benefit to our shared vision of connecting research and identifying knowledge. The partnership brings years of experience across our organizations and communities to scale sample community engagement, develop sample identifier practice standards, and increase adoption globally. In a study published 2023 by Knowledge Exchange it is highlighted that IGSN IDs point to physical objects instead of intellectual property or outcomes (as DOIs mostly do) or their creators. Besides, the report emphasized that the service itself and its organisational framework were developed bottom-up in a sheer community-based effort.

== Example ==
An example of a publication using live IGSNs can be found here:

Dere, A. L., T. S. White, R. H. April, B. Reynolds, T. E. Miller, E. P. Knapp, L. D. McKay, and S. L. Brantley (2013), Climate dependence of feldspar weathering in shale soils along a latitudinal gradient, Geochimica et Cosmochimica Acta, 122, 101–126, https://dx.doi.org/10.1016/j.gca.2013.08.001.

This paper contains several samples identified by IGSN. One of them is IGSN: 10.58052/SSH000SUA. Information about this sample can be obtained by resolving the IGSN by adding the URL of the resolver before the IGSN: https://doi.org/10.58052/SSH000SUA.

IGSN can be used to identify samples and sampling features, such as boreholes or outcrops. The IGSN 10.60510/ICDP5054ESYI201 identifies a core section from core 5054_1_A_658_Z (IGSN 10.60510/ICDP5054ECYD101) of the COSC Expedition of the International Continental Scientific Drilling Program. The corresponding drill hole (sampling feature) 5054_1_A is identified by IGSN 10.60510/ICDP5054EEW1001.

== Sample Registration ==
Samples are registered through Allocating Agents. At present (November 2021) the following IGSN Allocation Agents register IGSN:

- System for Earth Sample Registration (SESAR)
- Geoscience Australia
- Commonwealth Scientific and Industrial Research Organisation Mineral Resources
- Australian Research Data Commons (ARDC)
- University of Bremen MARUM
- German Research Centre for Geosciences (GFZ)
- IFREMER Institut Français de Recherche pour l'Exploitation de la Mer
- Korea Institute of Geoscience & Mineral Resources (KIGAM)
- Kiel University

To obtain an IGSN, users need to register a sample by submitting information about it to an IGSN Allocating Agent. Once logged in, users can:

- register individual samples or batches
- register sampling features
- track relationships between samples and subsamples (e.g., bulk samples and mineral separates)
- update information on registered samples
- download QR code images for labelling purposes

== See also ==
- Digital Object Identifier
- Handle System
- DataCite
- LSID
- Observations and Measurements
