= International Conference on Systems Biology =

The International Conference on Systems Biology (ICSB) is the primary international conference for systems biology research. Created by Hiroaki Kitano in 2000, its organization is now coordinated by the International Society for Systems Biology (ISSB).

== Previous conferences ==
- ICSB-2024, Bombay, India (IIT)
- ICSB-2023, Hartford, Connecticut, USA
- ICSB-2022, in person - Berlin, Germany.
- ICSB-2021, canceled due to COVID
- ICSB-2020, canceled due to COVID
- ICSB-2019, Okinawa, Japan (Okinawa Institute of Science and Technology Graduate University).
- ICSB-2018, Lyon, France (Université de Lyon).
- ICSB-2017, Blacksburg, Virginia (Virginia Tech).
- ICSB-2016, Barcelona, Spain.
- ICSB-2015 was originally announced to be in Shanghai, but then was held in Singapore.
- ICSB-2014, Melbourne, Australia.
- ICSB-2013, Copenhagen, Denmark.
- ICSB-2012, Toronto, Canada.
- ICSB-2011, Mannheim, Germany.
- ICSB-2010 Edinburgh, UK
- ICSB-2009 Stanford, California (Stanford University)
- ICSB-2008 Gothenburg, Sweden (CMB, Chalmers Biocenter, YSBN, NYRC)
- ICSB-2007 Long Beach, California (Caltech, UC Irvine, etc.)
- ICSB-2006 Yokohama (The Systems Biology Institute, JST, RIKEN, AIST)
- ICSB-2005 Boston (Harvard, MIT, Boston University)
- ICSB-2004 Heidelberg (DFKI, EMBL, etc.)
- ICSB-2003 St. Louis (Washington University in St. Louis)
- ICSB-2002 Stockholm (Karolinska Institute)
- ICSB-2001 Pasadena, California (California Institute of Technology)
- ICSB-2000 Tokyo (Japan Science and Technology Agency)

== Upcoming conferences ==
- ICSB-2025, Dublin, Ireland
