= List of OBO Foundry ontologies =

This is a list of ontologies that are part of the OBO Foundry as of January 2020.

== OBO Foundry ontologies ==
Title	Prefix	Description	Official page
Agronomy Ontology	AGRO	Ontology of concepts relevant to agronomy experiments.	
An ontology of core ecological entities	ECOCORE	An ontology for ecological entities.	
Anatomical Entity Ontology	AEO	Ontology of anatomical structures that expand CARO, the Common Anatomy Reference Ontology.	
Antibiotic Resistance Ontology	ARO	Ontology for antibiotic resistance genes and mutations.	
Apollo Structured Vocabulary	APOLLO-SV	Ontology for enabling interoperability of epidemic models and public health application software.	
Ascomycete phenotype ontology	APO	A structured controlled vocabulary for the phenotypes of Ascomycete fungi.	
Basic Formal Ontology	BFO	The upper-level ontology upon which OBO Foundry ontologies are built.	
Beta Cell Genomics Ontology	BCGO	An application ontology built for beta cell genomic studies.	
Biological Collections Ontology	BCO	An ontology for biodiversity data.	
Biological Imaging Methods Ontology	FBBI	Ontology for methods involved in biomedical imaging, including preparation and acquisition.	
Biological Spatial Ontology	BSPO	An ontology for representing spatial concepts used in biology.	
BRENDA tissue / enzyme source	BTO	An ontology for the source of enzymes.	
C. elegans development ontology (see WormBase)	WBLS	An ontology for the development of Caenorhabditis elegans.	
C. elegans Gross Anatomy Ontology (see WormBase)	WBBT	An ontology for the anatomy of Caenorhabditis elegans.	
C. elegans phenotype (see WormBase)	WBPHENOTYPE	An ontology for the phenotypes of Caenorhabditis elegans.	
Cardiovascular Disease Ontology	CVDO	An ontology for concepts related to cardiovascular diseases.	
Cell Line Ontology	CLO	Ontology to describe cell lines.	
Cell Ontology	CL	Ontology for metazoan cell types.	
Chemical Entities of Biological Interest	CHEBI	Ontology of small molecular entities of biological interest.	
Chemical Information Ontology	CHEMINF	Ontology for descriptors used in chemoinformatics databases.	
Chemical Methods Ontology	CHMO	An ontology for the methods used in chemical experiments.	
Clinical LABoratory Ontology	LABO	An ontology of prescriptions and reports in clinical laboratories.	
Clinical measurement ontology	CMO	Ontology to classify clinical measurements of experimental animals.	
Common Anatomy Reference Ontology	CARO	An ontology to improve interoperability between anatomy ontologies for different organisms.	
Comparative Data Analysis Ontology	CDAO	Ontology of concepts and relations relevant to evolutionary comparative analysis, such as phylogenetic trees.	
Confidence Information Ontology	CIO	An ontology to describe confidence information in sequence annotations.	
Contributor Role Ontology	CRO	An ontology for the diverse roles behind a scientific research article.	
Ctenophore Ontology	CTENO	An anatomical and developmental ontology for ctenophores (Comb Jellies).	
Dictyostelium discoideum anatomy	DDANAT	A structured controlled vocabulary of the anatomy of the slime-mold Dictyostelium discoideum.	
Dictyostelium discoideum phenotype ontology	DDPHENO	An ontology for phenotypes of the slime-mould Dictyostelium discoideum.	
Drosophila development	FBDV	An ontology of the development of Drosophila melanogaster.	
Drosophila gross anatomy	FBBT	An ontology for the anatomy of Drosophila melanogaster.	
Drosophila Phenotype Ontology	FBCV	An ontology of common Drosophila phenotypes.	
Drug-drug Interaction and Drug-drug Interaction Evidence Ontology	DIDEO	Ontology for drug–drug interaction evidence.	
Evidence & Conclusion Ontology	ECO	An ontology for types evidence used to support scientific claims.	
eagle-i resource ontology	ERO	An ontology of research equipment, protocols and consumables.	
Emotion Ontology	MFOEM	An ontology of emotions, moods, and other kinds of feelings.	
Environment Ontology	ENVO	Ontology of environmental features and habitats.	
Experimental condition ontology	XCO	An ontology for the different conditions in which experimental measurements are taken.	
Exposure Ontology	EXO	Ontology to describe exposure to environmental factors (such as cigarette smoke) that might influence clinical outcomes.	
Fission Yeast Phenotype Ontology	FYPO	An ontology of phenotypes of fission yeast.	
Flora Phenotype Ontology	FLOPO	An ontology for traits and phenotypes of flowering plants.	
FlyBase Controlled Vocabulary	FBCV	An ontology to support the FlyBase project.	
Food Ontology	FOODON	An ontology to represent entities that play a food role or related to foods.	
Foundational Model of Anatomy Ontology (subset)	FMAO	Subset of the Foundational Model of Anatomy Ontology.	
Fungal Anatomy Ontology	FAO	An ontology for the anatomy of fungi.	
Gazetteer	GAZ	An ontology that acts as a gazetteer (geographical dictionary).	
Gene Ontology	GO	An ontology for describing the function of genes and gene products.	
Genomic Epidemiology Ontology	GENEPIO	An ontology for foodborne pathogens and associated outbreaks.	
Genotype Ontology	GENO	An ontology for genotypes and their related phenotypes and diseases.	
Geographical Entity Ontology	GEO	An ontology of geographical entities.	
Glycan Naming Ontology	GNOME	An ontology for glycans based on GlyTouCan.	
Homology Ontology	HOM	An ontology for concepts related to homology.	
Human Ancestry Ontology	HANCESTRO	An ontology of ancestry concepts used in the NHGRI-EBI Catalog of published genome-wide association studies.	
Human Developmental Stages	HSAPDV	An ontology of stages of the human life.	
Human Disease Ontology	DO	An ontology for describing human diseases.	
Human Phenotype Ontology	HPO	An ontology for human phenotypes in hereditary and non-hereditary diseases.	
HUPO-PSI cross-linking and derivatization reagents controlled vocabulary	PSI-MS	An ontology for reagents used to cross-link molecules in mass spectrometry experiments.	
Hymenoptera Anatomy Ontology	HAO	An ontology of the anatomy of the Hymenoptera (bees, wasps, and ants).	
Hypertension Ontology	HTN	An ontology for clinical data about hypertension.	
Infectious Disease Ontology	IDO	A set of ontologies related to infectious diseases.	
Information Artifact Ontology	IAO	An ontology of information entities.	
Informed Consent Ontology	ICO	An ontology for concepts related to informed consent, such as forms and policies.	
Integrative and Conjugative Element Ontology	ICEO	An ontology of bacterial integrative and conjugative elements (ICEs).	
Interaction Network Ontology	INO	An ontology for gene-gene interactions.	
Malaria Ontology	IDOMAL	An ontology for concepts related to malaria.	
Mammalian Feeding Muscle Ontology	MFMO	An ontology for the mammalian muscles that play a role in feeding behavior.	
Mammalian Phenotype Ontology	MP	Standard terms for annotating mammalian phenotypic data.	
Mass spectrometry ontology	MI	An ontology for concepts to describe mass spectrometry in the context of proteomics.	
Measurement method ontology	MMO	An ontology for methods of clinical and laboratory measurements.	
Medaka Developmental Stages	OlatDv	An ontology of life stages for the medaka fish.	
Mental Disease Ontology	MFOMD	An ontology for mental diseases.	
Mental Functioning Ontology	MFO	An ontology for concepts related to mental functioning.	
MHC Restriction Ontology	MRO	An ontology for Major Histocompatibility Complex (MHC) restriction in experiments.	
MIAPA Ontology	MIAPA	An ontology for phylogenetic data.	
Microbial Conditions Ontology	MCO	An ontology for microbial growth conditions.	
Minimum PDDI Information Ontology	MPIO	An ontology of the minimum information to describe drug–drug interactions.	
Molecular Interactions Controlled Vocabulary	MI	An ontology for concepts related to the study of protein-protein interactions.	
Mondo Disease Ontology	MONDO	An ontology for the integration of information on disease.	
Mosquito gross anatomy ontology (VectorBase)	TGMA	An ontology for the anatomy of mosquitoes.	
Mouse adult gross anatomy ontology	EMAPA	An ontology for the adult anatomy of the mouse (Mus).	
Mouse Developmental Stages	MmusDv	An ontology of stages of the mouse (Mus) life.	
Mouse gross anatomy and development, timed	EMAP	Ontology of anatomical structures of the mouse (Mus musculus).	
Mouse Pathology Ontology	MPATH	An ontology of mouse pathology phenotypes.	
Name Reaction Ontology	RXNO	An ontology for organic reactions in organic synthesis.	
NCBI organismal classification	NCBITaxon	An ontology representation of the NCBI organismal taxonomy.	
Neuro Behavior Ontology	NBO	An ontology of behavioral phenotypes of animals.	
NOMEN - A nomenclatural ontology for biological names	NOMEN	An ontology of the rules of nomenclature for biological names.	
Non-Coding RNA Ontology	NCRO	An ontology for non-coding RNA function.	
Ontologized MIABIS	OMIABIS	An ontological version of MIABIS (Minimum Information About BIobank data Sharing).	
Ontology for Biobanking	OBIB	An ontology for concepts related to biobanks.	
Ontology for Biomedical Investigations	OBI	An ontology which describes biological processes, cellular components and molecular functions in living organisms.	
Ontology for General Medical Science	OGMS	An ontology for general aspects of medicine, with a focus on cancer.	
Ontology for Parasite LifeCycle	OPL	A reference ontology for parasite life cycle stages.	
Ontology of Adverse Events	OAE	An ontology for adverse events of drug regimens.	
Ontology of Arthropod Circulatory Systems	OARCS	An ontology for the circulatory systems of arthropods.	
Ontology of Biological and Clinical Statistics	OBCS	An ontology to describe statistical tools and methods used in biomedical investigation.	
Ontology of Biological Attributes	OBA	An ontology for biological traits.	
Ontology of Medically Related Social Entities	OMRSE	An ontology for entities (roles and organizations) related to healthcare.	
Ontology of Microbial Phenotypes	OMP	An ontology of phenotypes of microorganisms.	
Ontology of Organizational Structures of Trauma centers and Trauma systems	OOSTT	An ontology for the organizational structures of trauma centers and trauma systems.	
Ontology of Precision Medicine and Investigation	OPMI	An ontology for concepts related to precision medicine.	
Ontology of Prokaryotic Phenotypic and Metabolic Characters	MICRO	An ontology of prokaryotic phenotypic and metabolic characters.	
Ontology of RNA Sequencing	ORNASEQ	An ontology to annotate RNA Sequencing experiments.	
Ontology of Vaccine Adverse Events	OVAE	An ontology for adverse events of vaccines.	
Pathogen Host Interaction Phenotype Ontology	PHIPO	An ontology of phenotypes that occur in pathogen-host interactions.	
Pathogen Transmission Ontology	TRANS	An ontology for disease transmission processes.	
Pathway ontology	PW	An ontology for annotating gene products to pathways.	
Performance Summary Display Ontology	PSDO	An ontology for concepts related to performance information for teams and organizations.	
Phenotype And Trait Ontology	FOBI	FOBI (Food-Biomarker Ontology) is an ontology to represent food intake data and associate it with metabolomic data.	
Planaria Ontology	PLANA	An ontology for the anatomy and developmental stages of the planaria (Schmidtea mediterranea).	
Planarian Phenotype Ontology	PLANP	An ontology for phenotypes of the planaria (Schmidtea mediterranea).	
Plant Experimental Conditions Ontology	PECO	An ontology for concepts related to plant biology experiments.	
Plant ontology	PO	An ontology and database resource that links plant traits to genomics data.	
Plant Phenology Ontology	PPO	An ontology for describing the cyclic phenomena of plants.	
Plant Trait Ontology	TO	An ontology for phenotypic traits in plants.	
Platynereis Developmental Stages	PDUMDV	An ontology for life stages of the annelid Platynereis dumerilii.	
Population and Community Ontology	PCO	An ontology for describing groups of interacting organisms.	
Porifera Ontology	PORO	An ontology for the anatomy of sponges (Porifera)	
Protein modification	MOD	An ontology for protein chemical modifications.	
Protein Ontology	PRO	An ontological representation of protein-related entities.	
Rat Strain Ontology	RS	An ontology for laboratorial rat strains.	
Relation Ontology	RO	An ontology for relations between terms in the ontologies.	
Scientific Evidence and Provenance Information Ontology	SEPIO	An ontology for the provenance of scientific claims and supporting evidence.	
Sequence types and features ontology	SO	An ontology for annotation of sequences.	
Software Ontology	SWO	An ontology to describe software applications with a focus on bioinformatics tools.	
Spider Ontology	SPD	An ontology for anatomy and behavior of spiders as well as spider-derived products.	
Symptom Ontology	SYMP	An ontology of disease symptoms.	
Taxonomic rank vocabulary	TAXRANK	An ontology of taxonomic ranks in systematics.	
Teleost taxonomy ontology	TTO	An ontology for the taxonomy of teleost fish.	
The Data Use Ontology	DUO	Ontology for conditions of data use.	
The Drug Ontology	DRON	An ontology for drug products.	
The Ontology of Genes and Genomes	OGG	An ontology of genes and genomes of biological organisms.	
The Oral Health and Disease Ontology	OHD	An ontology for the content of teeth-related health records.	
The Prescription of Drugs Ontology	PDRO	An ontology for concepts related to prescription of drugs.	
The Statistical Methods Ontology	STATO	An ontology for statistical methods, such as tests and experimental designs.	
Tick Anatomy Ontology	TADS	An ontology for the anatomy of the tick families Ixodidae and Argasidae.	
Uberon multi-species anatomy ontology	UBERON	An integrative, cross species ontology for anatomical terms.	
Unified phenotype ontology (uPheno)	UPHENO	An ontology for unified phenotypical descriptictions.	
Units of measurement ontology	UO	An ontology of metrical units, couplet to the PATO ontology.	
Vaccination Informed Consent Ontology	VICO	An ontology of clinical informed consents focused on vaccination procedures.	
Vaccine Ontology	VO	An ontology for concepts related to vaccines and vaccination.	
Vertebrate Taxonomy Ontology	VTO	An ontology for the taxonomy of vertebrates.	
Vertebrate Trait Ontology	VT	An ontology for traits covering vertebrates	
VEuPathDB ontology	EUPATH	An ontology for the support of the Eukaryotic Pathogen, Host & Vector Genomics Resource.	
Xenopus Anatomy Ontology	XAO	Ontology of the anatomy of the African clawed frog (Xenopus laevis).	
Xenopus Phenotype Ontology	XPO	An ontology for anatomical, cellular, and gene function phenotypes in African clawed frogs (Xenopus laevis).	
Zebrafish anatomy and development ontology	ZFA	Ontology for the anatomy and development of the zebrafish (Danio rerio).	
Zebrafish developmental stages ontology	ZFS	An ontology for developmental stages of the zebrafish (Danio rerio).	
Zebrafish Experimental Conditions Ontology	ZECO	An ontology for experimental conditions used in zebrafish research and described in ZFIN.	
Zebrafish Phenotype Ontology	ZP	An ontology for the phenotypes of the zebrafish (Danio rerio).	
