= BacDive =

Online database for bacteria

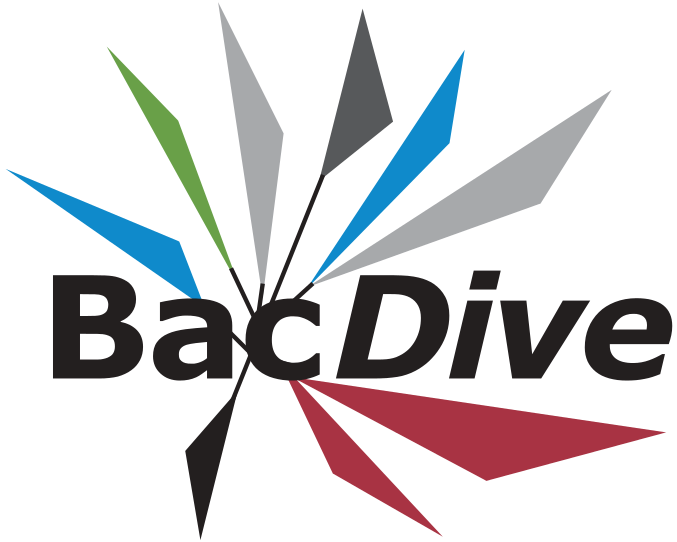

Content
- Description: The Bacterial Diversity Database

Contact
- Research center: Leibniz Institute DSMZ - German Collection of Microorganisms and Cell Cultures GmbH
- Primary citation: PMID 39470737
- Release date: 2012

Access
- Website: http://bacdive.dsmz.de/
- Web service URL: https://api.bacdive.dsmz.de/
- Sparql endpoint: https://sparql.dsmz.de/bacdive/

BacDive (The Bacterial Diversity Database) is the worldwide largest database for standardized bacterial and archaeal strain-level information.

BacDive is a comprehensive resource containing diverse data on bacterial and archaeal strains, including taxonomy, morphology, physiology, sampling and environmental data and sequence information. The database is built on a base of curated data from culture collections. In 2025 BacDive contains information on 99,392 strains, including 21,168 type strains. The database is hosted by the Leibniz Institute DSMZ - German Collection of Microorganisms and Cell Cultures GmbH and is part of the integrated DSMZ Digital Diversity infrastructure. BacDive is a member of de.NBI - the German Network for Bioinformatics Infrastructure, as well as ELIXIR. The Global Biodata Coalition designated BacDive a Global Core Biodata Resource (GCBR) in 2022. In 2023, BacDive was additionally named as an ELIXIR Core Data Resource.

== Database content ==
BacDive was initially released in April 2012 to standardize and make publicly available strain data of culture collections, other compendia, and publications. The first release, contained 89,758 entries for 18,157 strains and 179 different used data fields.

Today (as of December 2024), the database encompassed over 1000 different data fields. The database now comprises 2,709,516 entries for 99,392 strains. Each entry is linked to a reference. Data for each strain is divided into the categories "Name and taxonomic classification", "Morphology", "Culture and growth conditions, "Physiology and metabolism", "Isolation, sampling and environmental information." "Safety information", "Sequence information".

Since 2023 high-quality predicted data produced using machine learning models trained on curated BacDive data can be found in an additional section titled "Genome-based predictions".

== Data access ==
Data can be accessed either via a GUI, via the RESTful web service., or via a SPARQL endpoint.

The GUI offers a simple search featuring auto-completion for searching strains by name, culture collection number, NCBI Tax ID or INSDC sequence accession number. Additionally, the user can use the advanced search, which enables the search in 130 data fields and gives the opportunity of complex queries by combining several fields. Data can be downloaded in CSV format for one or multiple strains.

Via the RESTful web service portal BacDive content can be accessed automatically (a free registration is needed). To support the use of the API, software clients in Python and R are available.

== Other databases ==
For data that are outside the focus of BacDive, links to other databases are provided.

Other databases within the DSMZ Digital Diversity infrastructure:

- BRENDA
- List of Prokaryotic names with Standing in Nomenclature
- MediaDive
- SILVA
- Straininfo
- PhageDive

External databases:

- EBI
- ChEBI
- NCBI
- MicrobeAtlas
