= Global Initiative =

Global Initiative may refer to:

- Global Civilization Initiative
- Global Film Initiative
- Global Health Initiatives
- Global Health Security Initiative
- Global Health Share Initiative
- Global Initiative Against Transnational Organized Crime
- Global Initiative for Asthma
- Global Initiative for Emergency and Essential Surgical Care
- Global Initiative for Traditional Systems of Health
- Global Initiative on Psychiatry
- Global Initiative on Sharing Avian Influenza Data
- Global Initiative to Combat Nuclear Terrorism
- Global Marshall Plan Initiative
- Global Methane Initiative
- Global Network Initiative
- Global Peatlands Initiative
- Global Polio Eradication Initiative
- Global Reporting Initiative
- Globally Responsible Leadership Initiative
- Guggenheim UBS MAP Global Art Initiative
- Human Rights Accountability Global Initiative
- No Pain Labor & Delivery - Global Health Initiative
- Office of Global Women's Issues
- RNAi Global Initiative
- United Nations Global Compact
- Waterloo Global Science Initiative
