= Plant Phenology Ontology =

The Plant Phenology Ontology (PPO) is a collection of OBO Foundry ontologies that facilitate integration of heterogeneous data about seed plant phenology from various sources. These data sources include observations networks, such as the National Ecological Observatory Network (NEON), the National Phenology Network (NPN), and the Pan-European Phenology Database (PEP725), remote sensing, herbarium specimens, and citizen science observations. The initial focus during ontology development was to capture phenological data about one plant or a population of plants as observed by a person, and this enabled integration of data across disparate observation network sources. Because phenological scorings vary in their methods and reporting, this allows these data to be aggregated and compared. Changes in plant phenology can be linked to different climate factors depending on the species, such precipitation or growing degree days. Aggregated data about the timing of plant life cycle stages at different places and times can provide information about spatiotemporal patterns within and among species, and potentially offer insight into how plants may change or shift their life cycles in response to climate change. These shifts can have implications for agriculture and various biodiversity research avenues, such as shifts in pollinator and host life cycles.

== General structure ==
The structure of the Plant Phenology Ontology relies on integrated terms from other ontologies, notably the Basic Formal Ontology, the Plant Ontology, the Information Artifact Ontology, and the Biological Collections Ontology. The basic structure of the PPO models the 'observing process' (BCO:0000003), which has an input of a 'whole plant' (PO:0000003) and an output of a 'measurement datum' (IAO:0000109). The value of the 'measurement datum' is determined by what was observed or not observed on the plant. Measurement data in the PPO are numbers of upper counts and lower counts for some 'plant structure' (PO:0009011) on the observed plant. When the upper and lower counts both equal zero, an absence is inferred for that trait by the ontology using the HermiT reasoner. Plant Ontology anatomy terms were used to enable the ontology to infer the presence or absence of hierarchical phenological traits using the reasoner. For example, if pollen-releasing flower heads are observed to be present (PPO:0002340) with an upper count of five and lower count of five (meaning there are exactly five pollen-releasing flower heads on the observed plant), the reasoned ontology can also infer that floral structures are present (PPO:0002026) on the plant.

== Recent developments ==
Because most observation networks were only established in the early 2000s, they contain a wealth of plant phenological data for the 21st century, but do not offer insight into historical baselines. Herbarium specimens inherently capture the phenological traits of a plant in a specific location at a specific time. Because some herbarium collections date back to the 17th century, herbarium specimens represent an enormous amount of historical phenology data. These data would enable researchers to address new questions about how much the current climate has shifted from historical baselines.

Efforts have been made to expand the scope of the ontology to include observations made on herbarium specimens. Because the backbone of the existing PPO is built around the concept of whole plants, new logic had to be added to enable reasoning over data from parts of plants, because this is usually, though not always, what is captured by an herbarium specimen. The concept of 'portion of a plant' was added to the ontology, and a new relationship 'is or was part of' was added to describe how a 'portion of a plant' relates to a 'whole plant'. The new PPO release allows integration of phenology data from herbarium specimens, provided that observations or phenological scorings for the specimens already exist.

== Global Plant Phenology Data Portal ==
The Global Plant Phenology Data Portal is an interface that allows users to see data that have been ingested by the PPO. It provides a way for those unfamiliar with the ontology to search for and download plant phenology data of interest. It has also served as a proof of concept during ontology development, and as a means of checking these data.
