= Aaron Streets =

American academic

Aaron Michael Streets
- Education: University of California, Los Angeles Stanford University
- Known for: Work on developing a Human Cell Atlas that characterizes the genetic material of every single cell in the body.
- Awards: Chancellor’s Award for Advancing Institutional Excellence and Equity (CAAIEE) UC Bioengineering Systemwide Shu Chien Early Career Award Pew Biomedical Scholar
- Scientific career
- Fields: Bioengineering
- Workplaces: University of California, Berkeley CZ Biohub

Aaron Michael Streets is an American bioengineer and associate professor in the Department of Engineering at the University of California, Berkeley in Berkeley, California. He is the principal investigator at the Streets Lab, where he and his team use tools from mathematics, physics, and engineering to study biology. Streets is currently developing microfluidic technology, taking a deeper dive into single-cell measurements.

== Education ==
In 2004, Streets received both a B.S. in Physics Magna Cum Laude and a B.A. in Art Magna Cum Laude from the University of California, Los Angeles. In 2012, he received his Doctor of Philosophy (Ph.D.) in Applied Physics from Stanford University.

== Career and research ==
Streets was a Whitaker International Postdoctoral Fellow and a Ford postdoctoral fellow and worked with Yanyi Huang in the Biodynamic Optical Imaging Center (BIOPIC) at Peking University as a postdoctoral researcher, in Beijing, China from 2012 to 2016. In 2016, he accepted a position as a UC President's Postdoctoral Fellow at the University of California, San Francisco. Following his time there, he began working as an assistant professor in the Department of Bioengineering at the University of California, Berkeley from 2016 to 2022. In 2022, he received a promotion to associate professor at the University of California, Berkeley's Department of Bioengineering, where he still works today.

Streets is currently a core faculty for the Center for Computational Biology, Berkeley Biophysics, and an investigator for Chan Zuckerberg Biohub in San Francisco, California. He was recognized by Popular Science as one of the top up and coming scientists for his work on developing a Human Cell Atlas that characterizes the genetic material of every single cell in the body. In addition to his roles in research and education, Streets promotes diversity and shows how being an African American scientist intersects with a duty to advance student success and the effectiveness of academic institutions through service. Streets and the Chan Zuckerberg Biohub published a patent for microfluidic cell barcoding and sequencing in March 2023. This technology is used for high-resolution imaging of individual cells. In addition, Streets is working to connect genomic data to the spatial organization of molecules and other morphological phenotypes that are more effectively probed with light, using the capabilities of high resolution imaging to make multimodal measurements on single cells.

== Awards and honors ==
2023

- Chancellor's Award for Advancing Institutional Excellence and Equity (CAAIEE)

2021

- UC Bioengineering Systemwide Shu Chien Early Career Award

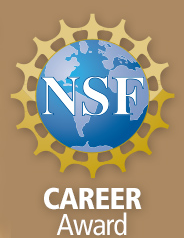
NSF CAREER Award

2019

- NSF CAREER award
- Pew Biomedical Scholar

2017–2021

- Chan Zuckerberg Biohub Investigator

2015

- UC President's Postdoctoral Fellow

2014

- Peking University Outstanding Postdoctoral Scholar
- Ford Foundation Postdoctoral Fellow

2011

- Whitaker International Biomedical Engineering Scholar

2009–2011

- Stanford Vice Provost for Graduate Education Diversifying Academia and Recruiting Excellence (DARE) Fellowship

== Publications ==
2023

- Streets, Aaron M, Tyler Chen, et al.; University of California CZ Biohub SF LLC, assignee. Microfluidic Cell Barcoding and Sequencing. United States patent US-20230093891-A1, 30 March 2023.

2014

- Streets, Aaron M, and Yanyi Huang. "How Deep Is Enough in Single-Cell RNA-Seq?" Nature Biotechnology, vol. 32, no. 10, 1 Oct. 2014, pp. 1005–1006, https://doi.org/10.1038/nbt.3039.
- Streets, Aaron M., Ang Li, et al. "Imaging without Fluorescence: Nonlinear Optical Microscopy for Quantitative Cellular Imaging". Analytical Chemistry, vol. 86, no. 17, 1 Sep. 2014, pp. 8506–8513, https://doi.org/10.1021/ac5013706.
- Streets, Aaron M., Xiannian Zhang, et al. "Microfluidic Single-Cell Whole-Transcriptome Sequencing". Proceedings of the National Academy of Sciences, vol. 111, no. 19, 1 May 2014, pp. 7048–7053, https://doi.org/10.1073/pnas.1402030111.
- Streets, Aaron M, and Yanyi Huang. "Microfluidics for Biological Measurements with Single-Molecule Resolution". Current Opinion in Biotechnology, vol. 25, 1 Feb. 2014, pp. 69–77, https://doi.org/10.1016/j.copbio.2013.08.013.

2013

- Streets, Aaron M., and Yanyi Huang. "Chip in a Lab: Microfluidics for next Generation Life Science Research". Biomicrofluidics, vol. 7, no. 1, 1 Jan. 2013, p. 011302, https://doi.org/10.1063/1.4789751.
- Streets, Aaron M., Yannick Sourigues, et al. "Simultaneous Measurement of Amyloid Fibril Formation by Dynamic Light Scattering and Fluorescence Reveals Complex Aggregation Kinetics". PLoS ONE, vol. 8, no. 1, 17 Jan. 2013, https://doi.org/10.1371/journal.pone.0054541.

2012

- Streets, Aaron Michael, Stephen Ronald Quake, et al. "Microfluidic and OPTOFLUIDIC Investigation of Biological Macromolecule Phase Transitions". Stanford University, Stanford University ProQuest Dissertations Publishing, 2012, pp. 1–113.

2011

- Kim, Soohong, Aaron M Streets, et al. "High-Throughput Single-Molecule OPTOFLUIDIC Analysis". Nature Methods, vol. 8, no. 3, 1 Jan. 2011, pp. 242–245, https://doi.org/10.1038/nmeth.1569.

2010

- Streets, Aaron M., and Stephen R. Quake. "Ostwald Ripening of Clusters during Protein Crystallization". Physical Review Letters, vol. 104, no. 17, 1 Jan. 2010, https://doi.org/10.1103/physrevlett.104.178102.
