= SIMBIOS =

SIMBIOS or Simbios may refer to:

- Simbios (Physics-based Simulation of Biological Structures), a center for the National Institute of Health, one of the National Centers for Biomedical Computing in the United States
- SIMBIOS (Scottish Informatics, Mathematics, Biology and Statistics), a Specialist Centre at the University of Abertay Dundee
