= Knut Reinert =

German researcher and professor of bioinformatics

Knut Reinert (born 19 January 1968) is a German computer scientist and bioinformatician who has worked in computational biology and algorithm development. He is currently a full professor at the Institute of Computer Science at Free University of Berlin, where he leads the Algorithmic Bioinformatics research group.

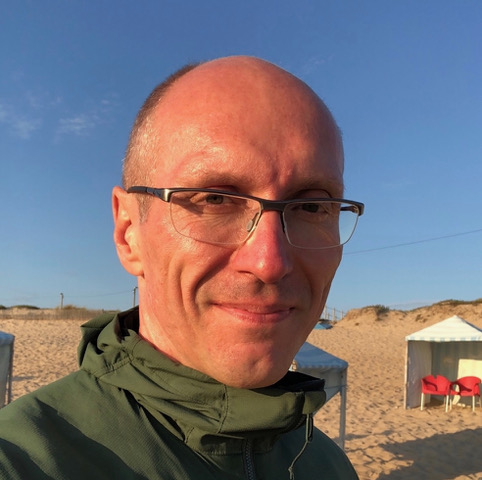
Knut Reinert

== Early life and education ==
Reinert completed his undergraduate studies in Computer Science at the University of the Saarland in 1994. He then pursued his doctoral studies at the Max Planck Institute for Informatics in Saarbrücken, earning his Ph.D. in Computer Science in 1999 under the supervision of Kurt Mehlhorn and Hans-Peter Lenhof. His doctoral thesis, titled "A Polyhedral Approach to Sequence Alignment Problems", focused on solving NP-hard sequence alignment problems for Proteins and RNA using methods from combinatorial optimization.

== Academic career ==
After completing his Ph.D., Reinert worked as a postdoctoral researcher at Celera Genomics (Rockville, USA) from 1999 to 2002. During this time, he worked in the Informatics Research group under the guidance of Gene Myers on the first whole genome shotgun assemblies of Drosophila melanogaster and Human. Later he also contributed on algorithms for the analysis of mass spectrometry analysis.

In 2002, Reinert joined Free University of Berlin as a professor in the Institute of Computer Science. He established the Algorithmic Bioinformatics research group, which has since become a leading center for bioinformatics research in Germany. Since 2015, his group is partner in the Center for Integrative Bioinformatics within the German Network for Bioinformatics Infrastructure project.

== Research ==
Reinert's research lies at the intersection of computer science and biology. His work spans several key areas, including algorithms for sequence analysis, processing large-scale sequencing data, and mass spectrometry data analysis. Focusing on developing efficient algorithms and data structures for analysing large-scale biological data, he started the development of SeqAn, an open-source C++ software library and co-started the OpenMS project together with Oliver Kohlbacher.

== Awards and recognition ==
Knut Reinert was appointed a Max-Planck fellow in 2014 and was accepted as a member of the German Academic Scholarship Foundation.
