= German Network for Bioinformatics Infrastructure =

de.NBI - German Network for Bioinformatics Infrastructure
- Established: 2015
- Mission: Big Data Exploitation in Life Science
- Coordinator: Alfred Pühler until 2021
- Members: 250
- Location: Bielefeld, Berlin, Bochum, Borstel, Braunschweig, Bremen, Dortmund, Dresden, Freiburg, Gatersleben, Gießen, Halle (Saale), Hamburg, Heidelberg, Jena, Jülich, Konstanz, Leipzig, Magdeburg, Munich, Rostock, Saarbrücken, Tübingen
- Website: www.denbi.de

The 'German Network for Bioinformatics Infrastructure – de.NBI' is a national, academic and non-profit infrastructure initiated by the Federal Ministry of Education and Research funding 2015-2021. The network provides bioinformatics services to users in life sciences research and biomedicine in Germany and Europe. The partners organize training events, courses and summer schools on tools, standards and compute services provided by de.NBI to assist researchers to more effectively exploit their data. From 2022, the network will be integrated into Forschungszentrum Jülich.

== History ==
In May 2013, the announcement of funding guidelines for a German Network for Bioinformatics Infrastructure (de.NBI) was published by the German Federal Ministry of Education and Research (BMBF). The aim of this announcement was to establish an infrastructure in Germany that will provide solutions to the ‘Big Data Problem’ in life science by means of bioinformatics services and training. A second announcement of funding guidelines for de.NBI partner projects was published in November 2015. The de.NBI program was launched by the BMBF in March 2015, and the partner projects started their work in November 2016. In August 2016, Germany joined ELIXIR, the European life-sciences Infrastructure for biological Information, with the German ELIXIR Node (ELIXIR Germany) being run by de.NBI partners.

The first coordinator of the de.NBI project was Alfred Pühler until 2021. The head of the German ELIXIR Node is Andreas Tauch.

== Organisation ==
The de.NBI network consists of the eight interconnected centers and one coordination unit including 40 research, service and infrastructure groups with about 250 bioinformaticians involved. In addition, it is possible to apply for an associated partnership as Service and Training Partner or as Training Partner within de.NBI.

- Heidelberg Center for Human Bioinformatics (HD-HuB)
  - Members: The German Cancer Research Center (DKFZ, research groups Boutros, Brors, Buchhalter), European Molecular Biology Laboratory (EMBL, research groups Bork, Huber, Korbel), Heidelberg University (research groups Rohr, Russell, Erfle), Charité Berlin (Research groups Eils, Ishaque) and Saarland University (Research group Walter)
  - Topic: Human Bioinformatics, e.g. Exome, Genomics, Transcriptomics, Metagenomics, Phenotyping, Bioimaging, Epigenetics and Cloud Computing
  - Associated Partner: Division of Computational Genomics and System Genetics (Dr. Oliver Stegle, DKFZ)
- Bielefeld-Gießen Resource Center for Microbial Bioinformatics (BiGi):
  - Members: Bielefeld University, University of Gießen and Otto von Guericke University Magdeburg
  - Topic: Microbial Bioinformatics, e.g. Genomics, Transcriptomics, Metagenomics, Proteomics, Metaproteomics, Metabolomics and Cloud Computing
- Bioinformatics for Proteomics (BioInfra.Prot):
  - Members: Ruhr University Bochum ("Medical Bioinformatics" research unit of the Medizinisches Proteom-Center), Leibniz Institute for Analytical Sciences ISAS e.v. Dortmund ("Department of Bioanalytics"), Research Center Borstel and Max Planck Institute of Molecular Cell Biology and Genetics
  - Topic: Proteomics and Lipidomics
- Center for Integrative Bioinformatics (CIBI):
  - Members: Free University of Berlin, University of Tübingen, University of Konstanz, Leibniz Institute of Plant Biochemistry Halle (Saale) and Max Planck Institute of Molecular Cell Biology and Genetics
  - Topic: Bioinformatics workflow management system, e.g. for Genomics, Proteomics, Metabolomics, Bioimaging, Deep learning and Machine learning
- RNA Bioinformatics Center (RBC):
  - Members: University of Freiburg, University of Leipzig, Max Delbrück Center for Molecular Medicine in the Helmholtz Association, Leibniz-Institut für Alternsforschung Jena and University of Rostock,
  - Topic: RNA bioinformatics, e.g. Transcriptome analysis, RNA structure analysis, prediction of ncRNA targets, definition and classification of RNA transcripts and the analysis of protein-RNA interaction
- German Crop BioGreenformatics Network (GCBN):
  - Members: Leibniz Institute of Plant Genetics and Crop Plant Research at Gatersleben (IPK, BIT, Uwe Scholz), Helmholtz Zentrum München (HMGU, PGSB, Klaus Mayer) and Forschungszentrum Jülich (FZJ, IBG-2 Plant Sciences, Björn Usadel).
  - Topic: Plant Bioinformatics, e.g. Genomics, Genome annotation, Phenotyping, Plant Databases
- Center for Biological Data (BioData):
  - Members: Deutsche Sammlung von Mikroorganismen und Zellkulturen, Braunschweig University of Technology, Jacobs University Bremen, University of Bremen, University of Hamburg
  - Topic: Databases
- de.NBI Systems Biology Service Center (de.NBI-SysBio):
  - Members: Heidelberg Institute for Theoretical Studies, Heidelberg University, University of Rostock and Max Planck Institute for Dynamics of Complex Technical Systems
  - Topic: Systems Biology and Data management

=== Associated Partners ===
The de.NBI network is open for further partners which like to take part in the network. These partners are called Associated Partners and are divided into two groups: Associated Service and Training Partners or Associated Training Partners. Associated Service und Training Partners offer at least one service and training course while Associated Training Partners only provide at least one training course to the de.NBI network. As of February 2020 the de.NBI network has six Associated Service and Training Partners (Kiel University, University of Jena, DKFZ, EMBL Heidelberg, RKI Werningerode, ZB MED, Heidelberg University, Federal Institute for Materials Research and Testing) and two Associated Training Partners (University Medical Center Hamburg-Eppendorf, University of Tübingen). These partners cover topics in Metabolomics, Phylogenetics, human bioinformatics, eukaryotic genomics, metaproteomics, NGS, 16S rRNA amplicon and single-cell analysis as well as the general IT topics Linux and scripting languages.

== Bioinformatics resources ==
The de.NBI network offers a large portfolio of resources for the German and international life science community. It mainly includes databases, bioinformatics tools and hardware based on a federated cloud system.

=== Databases ===
de.NBI develops and maintains the five large databases SILVA, PANGAEA, BacDive, ProteinsPlus and BRENDA. They provide access to ribosomal RNA genes from all three domains of life (SILVA), georeferenced data from earth system research (PANGAEA), strain-linked information on the different aspects of bacterial and archaeal biodiversity (BacDive), protein structures (ProteinPlus) and to comprehensive enzyme information (BRENDA).

=== Tools ===
de.NBI develops and supplies about 100 bioinformatics tools for the German and global life sciences community, e.g. Galaxy (computational biology)/useGalaxy.eu (Workflow engine for all Freiburg RNA Tools), EDGAR (Comparative Genome Analyses Plattform), KNIME (Workflow engine), OpenMS (Open-source software C++ library for LC/MS data management and analyses), SeqAN (Open source C++ library of efficient algorithms and data structures), PIA (toolbox for MS based protein inference and identification analysis), Fiji (software) (Image processing package), MetFrag (in silico fragmenter combines compound database searching and fragmentation prediction for small molecule identification from tandem mass spectrometry data), COPASI (open source software application for creating and solving mathematical models of biological processes), SIAMCAT (Framework for the statistical inference of associations between microbial communities and host phenotypes), e!DAL - PGP (Open source software framework to publish and share research data), MGX (Metagenome analysis), ASA³P (automated WGS analysis of bacterial cohorts), Bakta (annotation of bacterial genomes and plasmids) and many more.

de.NBI tools are also registered and searchable in the ELIXIR Tools and Data Services Registry that provides more information in a standardized format.

=== Hardware ===
de.NBI develops and maintains a cloud system (de.NBI cloud) started in 2016. It is a collaboration project between the universities of Bielefeld, Freiburg, Gießen, Heidelberg and Tübingen. The whole system is accessible through a single sign-on (SSO) via the central de.NBI Cloud Portal and is based on the ELIXIR Authentication and authorization infrastructure (ELIXIR AAI). The de.NBI cloud comprises more than 56,000 computing cores and 80 petabytes of storage capacity (as of November 2021).

== Training ==
Different types of training activities are supported and organized by de.NBI. First of all, the summer schools provide training courses for undergraduate and graduate students in specific topics related to one or several de.NBI centers. The respective centers organize tool-specific training. These trainings are attached to existing conferences or organized independently. In addition, online training was introduced on the de.NBI website in 2016. Since 2017, online training formats like hackathons or webinars are offered by all service centers.

The de.NBI training program started in 2015 with 17 f2f training courses with 329 participants, steadily increasing to 79 courses with 1586 Participants in 2019. In 2020 and 2021, the practical delivery of training was significantly affected by the COVID-19 pandemic, but the development of online training and materials (40 courses with 1,149 participants in 2020) enabled 2,128 training participants to be upskilled in 49 courses in 2021. A total of 9,076 scientists have been trained in 371 courses through our bioinformatics network to date (as of January 2022).

=== de.NBI Summer Schools ===
Next to the training courses de.NBI offers annual summer schools to cover a distinct topic in more detail. The first Summer School was held in 2015 by the Service Centers Bielefeld-Gießen (BiGi) Center for Microbial Bioinformatics, RBC and de.NBI-SysBio and was focused in the workflow from genome assembly to genome and transcriptome analysis. In the following years the Summer Schools were organized by the Service Centers BioInfraProt, CIBI and BiGi as well as BioData, GCBN and de.NBI-SysBio and held at different locations throughout Germany. The Summer Schools covered the topics proteomics and mass spectrometry data (2016), Cloud Computing for Bioinformatics (2017), Computational genomics and RNA biology (2017), Metabolomics (2018), Research Data Management (2018) and (Bio)Data Science (2019). Two de.NBI Summer Schools took place in 2021. 1) Analysis of mass spectrometry data in proteomics, lipidomics and Metabolomics organized by BioInfra.Prot, CIBI and de.NBI-SysBio, 2) Microbial Community Analysis organized by BiGi and HD-HuB.

=== Additional de.NBI Schools ===
In addition, as an outreach activity de.NBI supported the Summer School BioByte 2019 at University of Halle addressed at high school students which offers an ideal opportunity to get to know the diversity of bioinformatics.
