= MGED =

MGED may refer to:

- The FGED Society, formerly known as the MGED Society, a genomics research data sharing organization.
- MGED, the "Multi-device Geometry EDitor", a computer program that is part of the BRL-CAD software.
