= RNAi Global Initiative =

Alliance of international biomedical researchers

- Company type: Non-profit
- Founded: 2005
- Website: www.rnaiglobal.org

The RNAi Global Initiative is an alliance of international biomedical researchers that has been established to increase and accelerate the utility of genome-wide RNAi libraries.

Genome-wide RNAi screening has the potential to fundamentally change biological research by increasing scientists' ability to understand disease mechanisms and facilitating faster drug discovery and development. The RNAi Global Initiative provides a forum for member institutions to share research protocols, establish experimental standards, and develop mechanisms for exchanging and comparing screening data.

This ongoing interaction between the RNAi Global Initiative members is expected to help researchers optimize high-throughput human-genome-wide RNAi screening and accelerate drug discovery. Membership is open to non-profit biomedical research institutions across the globe.

The RNAi Global Initiative was established and is being coordinated under the auspices of the Dharmacon Product line of GE Healthcare, whose Research and Development scientists actively contribute to the Initiative.

== MIARE ==
Through collaboration and the meaningful exchange of information and data, the RNAi Global Initiative intends to draw a comprehensive roadmap of human gene function and use this as a foundation to revolutionize the way medicine and healthcare are delivered.

To this end, members of the RNAi Global Initiative are actively engaged in promoting the concept and implementation of minimum information standards to facilitate data sharing within the extended RNAi community. Building on established standards such as MIAME (Minimum Information About a Microarray Experiment), the RNAi Global Initiative has contributed work towards a community-wide effort known as the Minimum Information About an RNAi Experiment (MIARE). These reporting guidelines were developed in part by a large inter-laboratory benchmarking study and in part by workshops and discussions amongst the RNAi Global Initiative members.

== Member Institutions ==
As of January 2010, there were over 50 member groups in 15 different countries.
