= National Center for Integrative Biomedical Informatics =

US research center

The National Center for Integrative Biomedical Informatics (NCIBI) is one of seven National Centers for Biomedical Computing funded by the National Institutes of Health's (NIH) Roadmap for Medical Research. The center is based at the University of Michigan and is part of the Center for Computational Medicine and Bioinformatics. NCIBI's mission is to create targeted knowledge environments for molecular biomedical research to help guide experiments and enable new insights from the analysis of complex diseases. It was established in October 2005.

The Center develops computational methods to effectively access and integrate biological data. Driving Biological Projects (DBPs) provide a starting point from which tool development is informed, launched, and tested. Current DBPs include gene fusion in cancers, major organ-specific complications of diabetes, nutrition and obesity, and co-morbid disease associations of bipolar disorder. In addition to testing tools for function, a separate team is dedicated to testing usability and user interaction.

Once tools are developed and validated, the Center disseminates data and software throughout the University and the broader biomedical research community. Various mechanisms such as training videos, tutorials, and demonstrations and presentations at prominent scientific conferences are used to share NCIBI data and software nationally and internationally.

== Available tools ==
In addition to the tools listed below, the enriched data contained in many NCIBI databases is available from the Databases tab on the Try Our Tools page.

=== Exploratory analysis ===
Name	Description
ConceptGen	An open source gene set enrichment testing and concept mapping tool. This web-based tool can be used both to identify biological gene sets (called concepts) enriched with differentially expressed genes (or any other user-identified gene list), and to explore networks of relationships among biological concepts from diverse biological sources
MetScape	A Cytoscape plugin used to visualize and analyze metabolomic data. It uses the data from Edinburgh Human Metabolic Network reconstruction. MetScape facilitates visualization of complex networks and displays related information about reactions, enzymes, and pathways
MiMI Plugin	A Cytoscape plugin that is an open source interactive visualization tool for analyzing protein interactions and their biological effects
Michigan Molecular Interactions (MiMI)	A web based protein, pathway and gene interaction tool

=== Conceptual literature searching ===
Name	Description
BioSearch-2D	A tool that renders the contents of large biomedical document collections into a single, dynamic map
Gene2Mesh	An automated annotation tool that associates Medical Subject Heading (MeSH) terms with genes using the National Library of Medicine's PubMed literature database
Metab2MeSH	A tool that uses a statistical approach to reliably and automatically annotate metabolites with the concepts defined in MeSH, the National Library of Medicine's controlled vocabulary for biomedical concepts
MiSearch	A literature search tool that works with the National Center for Biotechnology Information's (NCBI) Entrez to rapidly search PubMed citations and display them ranked by relevancy to research interests
PubAnatomy	A literature exploration tool that provides new ways to explore relationships among anatomical structures, pathophysiological processes, gene expression levels and protein–protein interactions in the context of Medline literature and experimental data
PubOnto	A literature exploration tool that provides multiple ontologies from the Open Biomedical Ontologies to help researchers explore literature from different perspectives

== See also ==
- Bioinformatics
- Biomedical Informatics
