= The Plant Phenomics and Genomics Research Data Repository =

The Plant Genomics and Phenomics Research Data Repository (PGP) is a data publication infrastructure to comprehensively publish multi-domain plant research data. It is hosted at the Leibniz Institute of Plant Genetics and Crop Plant Research (IPK) in Gatersleben, Germany.

The repository hosts Digital Object Identifier (DOI) citable datasets that are not published in public repositories because of their volume or data scope. PGP enables the publication of gigabyte-scale datasets and is registered as a research data repository at FAIRSharing.org, re3data.org and OpenAIRE as a valid EU Horizon 2020 open data archive. PGP fulfills the FAIR data principles—findable, accessible, interoperable, reusable.

The PGP repository was created using the e!DAL software infrastructure and applies an on-premises approach to bring data to infrastructure.

== Data Content ==
All submitted and approved data are hosted at IPK Gatersleben and are stably citable in the long-term by a DOI. All datasets are linked in ORCID and indexed by all major web search engines. The PGP repository is accepted by data journals such as GigaScience and Nature Scientific Data as a recommended data repository. All published datasets may be explored in the PGP data report application or retrieved using the DataCite search web application.

== Data Submission ==
The PGP repository accepts submissions from the European plant science community. The web-based submission tool for small datasets and Java desktop submission tool for gigabyte scale datasets use the ELIXIR Authentication and authorization infrastructure (AAI). A review process ensures the technical quality of data submissions.

== German Network for Bioinformatics Infrastructure ==
The PGP repository is a part of the service portfolio of the German Crop BioGreenformatics Network (GCBN) node of the German Network for Bioinformatics Infrastructure.
