= Minimum information standard =

Minimum information standards are sets of guidelines and formats for reporting data derived by specific high-throughput methods. Their purpose is to ensure the data generated by these methods can be easily verified, analysed and interpreted by the wider scientific community. Ultimately, they facilitate the transfer of data from journal articles (unstructured data) into databases (structured data) in a form that enables data to be mined across multiple data sets. Minimal information standards are available for a vast variety of experiment types including microarray (MIAME), RNAseq (MINSEQE), metabolomics (MSI) and proteomics (MIAPE).

Minimum information standards typically have two parts. Firstly, there is a set of reporting requirements – typically presented as a table or a checklist. Secondly, there is a data format. Information about an experiment needs to be converted into the appropriate data format for it to be submitted to the relevant database. In the case of MIAME, the data format is provided in spreadsheet format (MAGE-TAB). Some of the communities that maintain minimum information standards also provide tools to help experimental researchers to annotate their data.

== MI Standards ==
The individual minimum information standards are brought by the communities of cross-disciplinary specialists focused on the problematic of the specific method used in experimental biology. The standards then provide specifications what information about the experiments (metadata) is crucial and important to be reported together with the resultant data to make it comprehensive. The need for this standardization is largely driven by the development of high-throughput experimental methods that provide tremendous amounts of data. The development of minimum information standards of different methods is since 2008 being harmonized by "Minimum Information about a Biomedical or Biological Investigation" (MIBBI) project.

=== MIAPPE, Minimum Information About a Plant Phenotyping Experiment ===
MIAPPE is an open, community driven project to harmonize data from plant phenotyping experiments. MIAPPE comprises both a conceptual checklist of metadata required to adequately describe a plant phenotyping experiment.

=== MIQE, Minimum Information for Publication of Quantitative Real-Time PCR Experiments ===
Published in 2009 these guidelines for the basis of requirements by many journals when submitting QPCR data, sadly they are not adhered to enough.

=== MIAME, gene expression microarray ===
Minimum Information About a Microarray Experiment (MIAME) describes the Minimum Information About a Microarray Experiment that is needed to enable the interpretation of the results of the experiment unambiguously and potentially to reproduce the experiment and is aimed at facilitating the dissemination of data from microarray experiments. It was published by the FGED Society in 2001 and was the first published minimum information standard for high-throughput experiments in the life sciences.

MIAME contains a number of extensions to cover specific biological domains, including MIAME-env, MIAME-nut and MIAME-tox, covering environmental genomics, nutritional genomics and toxogenomics, respectively.

=== MINI: Minimum Information about a Neuroscience Investigation ===
==== MINI: Electrophysiology ====
Electrophysiology is a technology used to study the electrical properties of biological cells and tissues. Electrophysiology typically involves the measurements of voltage change or electric current flow on a wide variety of scales from single ion channel proteins to whole tissues. This document is a single module, as part of the Minimum Information about a Neuroscience investigation (MINI) family of reporting guideline documents, produced by community consultation and continually available for public comment. A MINI module represents the minimum information that should be reported about a dataset to facilitate computational access and analysis to allow a reader to interpret and critically evaluate the processes performed and the conclusions reached, and to support their experimental corroboration. In practice a MINI module comprises a checklist of information that should be provided (for example about the protocols employed) when a data set is described for publication. The full specification of the MINI module can be found here.

=== MIARE, RNAi experiment ===
Minimum Information About an RNAi Experiment (MIARE) is a data reporting guideline which describes the minimum information that should be reported about an RNAi experiment to enable the unambiguous interpretation and reproduction of the results.

=== MIACA, cell based assay ===
Advances in genomics and functional genomics have enabled large-scale analyses of gene and protein function by means of high-throughput cell biological analyses. Thereby, cells in culture can be perturbed in vitro and the induced effects recorded and analyzed. Perturbations can be triggered in several ways, for instance with molecules (siRNAs, expression constructs, small chemical compounds, ligands for receptors, etc.), through environmental stresses (such as temperature shift, serum starvation, oxygen deprivation, etc.), or combinations thereof. The cellular responses to such perturbations are analyzed in order to identify molecular events in the biological processes addressed and understand biological principles. We propose the Minimum Information About a Cellular Assay (MIACA) for reporting a cellular assay, and CA-OM, the modular cellular assay object model, to facilitate exchange of data and accompanying information, and to compare and integrate data that originate from different, albeit complementary approaches, and to elucidate higher order principles. Documents describing MIACA are available and provide further information as well as the checklist of terms that should be reported.

=== MIAPE, proteomic experiments ===
The Minimum Information About a Proteomic Experiment documents describe information which should be given along with a proteomic experiment. The parent document describes the processes and principles underpinning the development of a series of domain specific documents which now cover all aspects of a MS-based proteomics workflow.

=== MIMIx, molecular interactions ===
This document has been developed and maintained by the Molecular Interaction worktrack of the HUPO-PSI (www.psidev.info) and describes the Minimum Information about a Molecular Interaction experiment.

=== MIAPAR, protein affinity reagents ===
The Minimum Information About a Protein Affinity Reagent has been developed and maintained by the Molecular Interaction worktrack of the HUPO-PSI (www.psidev.info)in conjunction with the HUPO Antibody Initiative and a European consortium of binder producers and seeks to encourage users to improve their description of binding reagents, such as antibodies, used in the process of protein identification.

=== MIABE, bioactive entities ===
The Minimum Information About a Bioactive Entity was produced by representatives from both large pharma and academia who are looking to improve the description of usually small molecules which bind to, and potentially modulate the activity of, specific targets in a living organism. This document encompasses drug-like molecules as well as herbicides, pesticides and food additives. It is primarily maintained through the EMBL-EBI Industry program (www.ebi.ac.uk/industry).

=== MIGS/MIMS, genome/metagenome sequences ===
This specification is being developed by the Genomic Standards Consortium

=== Minimum Information about a Flow Cytometry Experiment ===
The Minimum Information about a Flow Cytometry Experiment (MIFlowCyt) is a standard related to flow cytometry which establishes criteria to record information on experimental overview, samples, instrumentation and data analysis. It promotes consistent annotation of clinical, biological and technical issues surrounding a flow cytometry experiment.

=== MINDR, dual gene expression reporters ===
Requires (1) reporting absolute values of reporter readouts, (2) list of positive and negative controls, and (3) sequences of all reporter constructs.

=== MIAPA, Phylogenetic Analysis ===
Criteria for Minimum Information About a Phylogenetic Analysis were described in 2006.

=== MIRAGE, Glycomics ===
The MIRAGE project is supported and coordinated by the Beilstein-Institut to establish guidelines for data handling and processing in glycomics research

=== MIRIAM, Minimum Information Required in the Annotation of Models ===
The Minimal Information Required In the Annotation of Models (MIRIAM), is a set of rules for the curation and annotation of quantitative models of biological systems.

=== MIASE, Minimum Information About a Simulation Experiment ===
The Minimum Information About a Simulation Experiment (MIASE) is an effort to standardize the description of simulation experiments in the field of systems biology.

=== STRENDA, Standards for Reporting Enzymology Data ===
The Standards for Reporting Enzymology Data (STRENDA) is an initiative which specifically focuses on the development of guidelines for reporting (describing metadata) enzymology experiments with the aim to improve the quality of enzymology data published in the scientific literature.
