= RXNO Ontology =

Formal ontology of chemical named reactions

Tree diagram illustrating the RXNO Ontology

The RXNO Ontology is a formal ontology of chemical named reactions. It was originally developed at the Royal Society of Chemistry (RSC) and is associated with the Open Biomedical Ontologies Foundry. The RXNO ontology unifies several previous attempts to systematize chemical reactions including the Merck Index and the hierarchy of Carey, Laffan, Thomson and Williams.

== Major Reaction Categories ==
The twelve top-level reaction categories proposed by Carey, Laffan, Thompson and Williams are given in the table below, together with their RXNO ontology identifiers and the equivalent Wikipedia categories where applicable.

Index	Reaction Category	RXNO ID	Wikipedia Category
1	Heteroatom alkylation and arylation		Category:Carbon-heteroatom bond forming reactions
2	Acylation and related processes		
3	Carbon-Carbon bond formation	RXNO:0000002	Category:Carbon-carbon bond forming reactions
4	Heterocycle forming reactions	RXNO:0000349	Category:Heterocycle forming reactions
5	Protection reactions	RXNO:0000078	
6	Deprotection reactions	RXNO:0000203	
7	Reductions		Category:Organic reduction reactions
8	Oxidations		Category:Organic oxidation reactions
9	Functional group interconversion (FGI)	RXNO:0000011	Category:Substitution reactions
10	Functional group addition (FGA)		
11	Resolution reactions		
12	Miscellaneous		Category:Organic reactions

== Name Reactions ==
The following table lists the RXNO identifiers for some example name reactions.

RXNO:0000003 Perkin reaction
RNXO:0000006 Diels–Alder reaction
RXNO:0000014 Grignard reaction
RXNO:0000015 Wittig reaction
RXNO:0000021 Sandmeyer reaction
RXNO:0000024 Heck reaction
RXNO:0000026 Beckmann rearrangement
RXNO:0000028 Cope rearrangement
RXNO:0000031 Baeyer–Villiger oxidation
RXNO:0000042 Birch reduction
RXNO:0000043 Claisen condensation
RXNO:0000056 Horner–Wadsworth–Emmons reaction
RXNO:0000062 Skraup reaction
RXNO:0000064 Fischer indole synthesis
RXNO:0000074 Wurtz reaction
RXNO:0000081 Ullmann condensation
RXNO:0000084 Barbier reaction
RXNO:0000088 Negishi coupling
RXNO:0000090 Williamson ether synthesis
RXNO:0000098 Glaser coupling
RXNO:0000103 Gabriel synthesis
RXNO:0000106 Hunsdiecker reaction
RXNO:0000140 Suzuki reaction
RXNO:0000147 Emde degradation
RXNO:0000148 Claisen rearrangement
RXNO:0000156 Lossen rearrangement
RXNO:0000157 Nef reaction
RXNO:0000183 Perkow reaction
RXNO:0000193 Hiyama coupling
RXNO:0000210 Fleming–Tamao oxidation
RXNO:0000218 Cannizzaro reaction
RXNO:0000288 Rosenmund–von Braun reaction
RXNO:0000369 Friedel–Crafts reaction
RXNO:0000444 Fries rearrangement
RXNO:0000550 Collins oxidation

== See also ==
- List of organic reactions
