= Ontology Lookup Service =

Repository for biomedical ontologies

The Ontology Lookup Service (OLS) is a repository for biomedical ontologies, part of the ELIXIR infrastructure. It is supported by the European Bioinformatics Institute (EMBL-EBI).
