= Standards for Reporting Enzymology Data =

Standards for Reporting Enzymology Data (STRENDA) is an initiative as part of the Minimum Information Standards which specifically focuses on the development of guidelines for reporting (describing metadata) enzymology experiments. The initiative is supported by the Beilstein Institute for the Advancement of Chemical Sciences. STRENDA establishes both publication standards for enzyme activity data and STRENDA DB, an electronic validation and storage system for enzyme activity data. Launched in 2004, the foundation of STRENDA is the result of a detailed analysis of the quality of enzymology data in written and electronic publications.

== Organization ==
The STRENDA project is driven by 15 scientists from all over the world forming the STRENDA Commission and supporting the work with expertises in biochemistry, enzyme nomenclature, bioinformatics, systems biology, modelling, mechanistic enzymology and theoretical biology.

== Reporting guidelines ==
The STRENDA Guidelines propose those minimum information that is needed to comprehensively report kinetic and equilibrium data from investigations of enzyme activities including corresponding experimental conditions. This minimum information is suggested to be addressed in a scientific publication when enzymology research data is reported to ensure that data sets are comprehensively described. This allows scientists not only to review, interpret and corroborate the data but also to reuse the data for modelling and simulation of biocatalytic pathways. In addition, the guidelines support researchers making their experimental data reproducible and transparent.

As of March 2020, more than 55 international biochemistry journal included the STRENDA Guidelines in their authors' instructions as recommendations when reporting enzymology data. The STRENDA project is registered with FAIRsharing.org and the Guidelines are part of the FAIRDOM Community standards for Systems Biology.

== Applications ==
STRENDA DB

STRENDA DB is a web-based storage and search platform that has incorporated the Guidelines and automatically checks the submitted data on compliance with the STRENDA Guidelines thus ensuring that the manuscript data sets are complete and valid. A valid data set is awarded a STRENDA Registry Number (SRN) and a fact sheet (PDF) is created containing all submitted data. Each dataset is registered at Datacite and assigned a DOI to refer and track the data. After the publication of the manuscript in a peer-reviewed journal the data in STRENDA DB are made open accessible. STRENDA DB is a repository recommended by re3data and OpenDOAR. It is harvested by OpenAIRE. The database service is recommended in the authors' instructions of more than 10 biochemistry journals, including Nature, The Journal of Biological Chemistry, eLife, and PLoS. It has been referred as a standard tool for the validation and storage of enzyme kinetics data in multifold publications A recent study examining eleven publications, including Supporting Information, from two leading journals revealed that at least one omission was found in every one of these papers. The authors concluded that using STRENDA DB in the current version would ensure that about 80% auf the relevant information would be made available.

Data Management

STRENDA DB is considered a tool for research data management by the research community (e.g. EU project CARBAFIN).

== External References ==
- Record in FAIRSharing.org for STRENDA DB, https://fairsharing.org/FAIRsharing.ekj9zx
