= Global Initiative for Traditional Systems of Health =

- Founded: 1993
- Location: University of Oxford
- Region served: Worldwide
- Key people: Gerard Bodeker
- Website: Official Site

The Global Initiative for Traditional Systems of Health (GIFTS) is a program launched in 1993 at the headquarters of the Pan American Health Organization in Washington, D.C. GIFTS states its purpose of "bringing into policy focus the importance of traditional (indigenous) medicine in the daily lives and health care of the majority of the population of most emerging economies."
