= Biomedical Computation Review =

Open-access magazine

- Discipline: Computational biology
- Language: English

Publication details
- History: 2005 to present
- Publisher: Mobilize Center, Stanford University (United States)
- Frequency: quarterly
- Open access: Yes

Standard abbreviations
- ISO 4: Biomed. Comput. Rev.

Indexing
- ISSN: 1557-3192

Links
- Journal homepage

Biomedical Computation Review (BCR) is a quarterly, open-access magazine funded by the National Institutes of Health and published by the Mobilize Center at Stanford University. First published in 2005, BCR covers such topics as molecular dynamics, genomics, proteomics, physics-based simulation, systems biology, and other research involving computational biology. BCR's articles are targeted at those with a general science or biology background to build a community among biomedical computational researchers from various disciplines.
