= No Pain Labor & Delivery – Global Health Initiative =

Non-for-profit organization

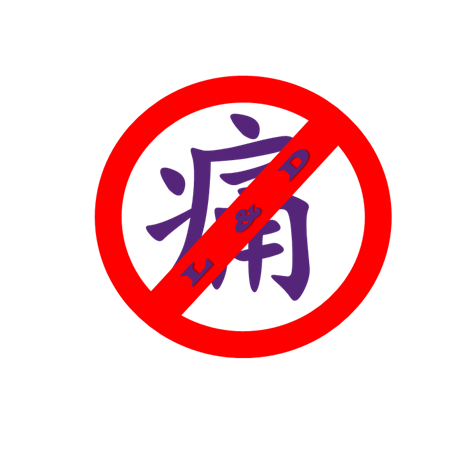
Logo

No Pain Labor & Delivery – Global Health Initiative (NPLD-GHI; 无痛分娩中国行) is a non-for-profit organization. Founded in 2006, the program focuses on correcting the unnecessarily high caesarean delivery rate and the poor utilization of neuraxial labor analgesia in China.

== History ==
The nongovernmental No Pain Labor & Delivery - Global Health Initiative (NPLD-GHI), established and designed to educate Chinese women and their health care providers about the safe and effective use of labor analgesia, was developed at the Northwestern University Feinberg School of Medicine in 2006. After its first trip in 2008, >500 volunteers participated in NPLD-GHI from the United States, Belgium, Canada, Germany, Israel, and China by 2016. These individuals include physician anesthesiologists, obstetricians (including maternal-fetal medicine specialists), neonatologists, midwives, labor and delivery nurses, senior anesthesiology residents/fellows, interpreters, and other volunteers. More than 200 lectures have been given as part of NPLD-GHI's educational program. Participants of NPLD-GHI co-hosted weekend conferences have increased from <100 in 2008 to just under 3000 in 2016 (6 conference sites). In recent years, NPLD-GHI members have participated in up to 15 obstetric and obstetric anesthesia conferences annually. Approximately 300 attendees participate each month in each Modern L&D Virtual Lecture Hall. The 55 participating hospitals cover care for a parturient population of approximately 500,000 annually. The Obstetric Anesthesia Infrastructure Development (OAID) project was initiated at 31 hospitals in 25 cities from 2008 to 2016. The annual number of hospital sites visited increased from 1 in 2008 to 6 in 2016. Since 2014, 6 additional hospitals each year have participated in the Obstetric Anesthesia Support (OAS) project to meet the local increased demands. Furthermore, its Private Hospital (PH) Project has been initiated since September 2015.

=== Background ===
Neuraxial labor analgesia is commonly available in high-income countries. These techniques have been shown to be safe and effective for alleviating labor pain. Neuraxial analgesia is associated with improved maternal and neonatal outcomes and has been recommended by American College of Obstetricians and Gynecologists (ACOG), American Society of Anesthesiologists (ASA) and The Society for Obstetric Anesthesia and Perinatology (SOAP) as a proactive approach for high-risk parturient safety during labor., In contrast, a 2007 study reported that neuraxial labor analgesia was used by <1% of parturients in China.

=== Initiation ===
NPLD-GHI was established and designed to educate Chinese women and their health care providers about the safe and effective use of labor analgesia, was developed at the Northwestern University Feinberg School of Medicine. Launched in 2008, NPLD-GHI's goals were to improve maternal and neonatal clinical outcomes by increasing the rate of labor epidural analgesia by 10% and to promote sustained change in obstetric anesthesia care, with measurable improvements in outcome.A later study at Weixian Renmin Hospital found that the proportion of live births by cesarean delivery decreased from 49.6% before the NPLD-GHI program to 45.5% after the program.

== Project structure ==
The first three are basic obstetric projects: the Obstetric Anesthesia Infrastructure Development (OAID) Project, the Obstetric Anesthesia Support (OAS) Project, and the Private Hospital (PH) Project. The fourth is the Advanced Obstetric Anesthesia 1 + 2 + 3 Project (AOA123), designed not only to advance engaged hospitals from providing a safe and effective neuraxial labor analgesia services to reaching a full range of state-of-the-art obstetric and anesthetic services, but also to have self sustainable improvements.

=== Basic Obstetric Anesthesia projects ===
The Obstetric Anesthesia Infrastructure Development (OAID) Project was launched in 2008 at the Women's Hospital of Zhejiang University School of Medicine. It has since been implemented at 24 additional hospitals. The OAID project involves a week-long, hands-on session offered by an interdisciplinary team from the United States, Canada, and Europe. The program is offered at 1 to 6 sites per year, depending on the number of volunteers and available resources. OAID is offered only to sites that meet specific screening requirements

NPLD-GHI OAID Site Screening Assessment:

- Adequate anesthesia manpower for 24/7 obstetric anesthesia coverage.
- Multidisciplinary incentives for labor analgesia.
- Financial and administrative support from hospital administration.

After the assessment, a team of 11–12 volunteers including obstetric anesthesiology attending physicians, anesthesiology residents, obstetricians, labor and delivery nurses, neonatologist or neonatal intensive care nurse, and interpreters travel to one of the screened hospitals. The team leader is typically a Chinese-born obstetric anesthesiologist practicing in the United States. The team leader is thus fluent in both Mandarin and English and familiar with Western standards of obstetric care. A typical week schedule consists of daily themes: 1. Orientation day, 2. Mother safety day, 3. Baby safety day, 4. No pain day, 5. Patient satisfaction day, 6. Crash day, 7. Conference day.

The Obstetric Anesthesia Support (OAS) Project was established in 2014 as an alternative to OAID for hospitals that only partially met the screening metrics for OAID. Typically, this is intended for hospitals that lacked the necessary administration support. Rather than a 1-week visit by a NPLD-GHI team, the labor ward professionals from these hospitals are invited to OAID sites during the NPLD-GHI training week to observe educational activities. The goal of OAS is to maximize the NPLD-GHI's impact in hospitals with limited resources, especially personnel, and for the visiting Chinese professionals to take the knowledge acquired during the NPLD-GHI training sessions back to their own hospitals and implement it locally.

In order to meet the demands from Chinese private hospitals due to recently China's healthcare system reform, NPLD-GHI has started its Private Hospital (PH) Project, another alternative to OAID for mainly private hospitals since September 2015. A total of 12 hospitals have participated in the PH project by October 2016.
