= Uberon =

Representation of anatomical structures

Content
- Description: Uberon, an integrative multi-species anatomy ontology.
- Data types captured: Anatomical Structures
- Organisms: Metazoa

Contact
- Primary citation: Mungall & al. (2012)
- Release date: 2012

Access
- Data format: OWL and OBO
- Website: http://obophenotype.github.io/uberon/
- Download URL: http://purl.obolibrary.org/obo/uberon/merged.owl
- Sparql endpoint: http://sparql.hegroup.org/sparql

Miscellaneous
- License: open

The Uber-anatomy ontology (Uberon) is a comparative anatomy ontology representing a variety of structures found in animals, such as lungs, muscles, bones, feathers and fins. These structures are connected to other structures via relationships such as part-of and develops-from. One of the uses of this ontology is to integrate data from different biological databases, and other species-specific ontologies such as the Foundational Model of Anatomy.
