= Ontology for Biomedical Investigations =

Open-access, integrated ontology

The Ontology for Biomedical Investigations (OBI) is an open-access, integrated ontology for the description of biological and clinical investigations. OBI provides a model for the design of an investigation, the protocols and instrumentation used, the materials used, the data generated and the type of analysis performed on it. The project is being developed as part of the OBO Foundry and as such adheres to all the principles therein such as orthogonal coverage (i.e. clear delineation from other foundry member ontologies) and the use of a common formal language. In OBI the common formal language used is the Web Ontology Language (OWL). As of March 2008, a pre-release version of the ontology was made available at the project's SVN repository.

== Scope ==
The Ontology for Biomedical Investigations (OBI) addresses the need for controlled vocabularies to support integration and joint ("cross-omics") analysis of experimental data, a need originally identified in the transcriptomics domain by the FGED Society, which developed the MGED Ontology as an annotation resource for microarray data.Smith B, Ashburner M, Rosse C, Bard J, Bug W, Ceusters W, et al. (November 2007). "The OBO Foundry: coordinated evolution of ontologies to support biomedical data integration". Nature Biotechnology. 25 (11): 1251–5. doi:10.1038/nbt1346. PMC 2814061. PMID 17989687. OBI uses the basic formal ontology upper-level ontology as a means of describing general entities that do not belong to a specific problem domain. As such, all OBI classes are a subclass of some BFO class.

The ontology has the scope of modeling all biomedical investigations and as such contains ontology terms for aspects such as:

- biological material – for example blood plasma
- instrument (and parts of an instrument therein) – for example DNA microarray, centrifuge
- information content – such as an image or a digital information entity such as an electronic medical record
- design and execution of an investigation (and individual experiments therein) – for example study design, electrophoresis material separation
- data transformation (incorporating aspects such as data normalization and data analysis) – for example principal components analysis dimensionality reduction, mean calculation

Less 'concrete' aspects such as the role a given entity may play in a particular scenario (for example the role of a chemical compound in an experiment) and the function of an entity (for example the digestive function of the stomach to nutriate the body) are also covered in the ontology.

== OBI consortium ==
The MGED Ontology was originally identified in the transcriptomics domain by the FGED Society and was developed to address the needs of data integration. Following a mutual decision to collaborate, this effort later became a wider collaboration between groups such as FGED, PSI and MSI in response to the needs of areas such as transcriptomics, proteomics and metabolomics and the FuGO (Functional Genomics Investigation Ontology) was created. This later became the OBI covering the wider scope of all biomedical investigations.

As an international, cross-domain initiative, the OBI consortium draws upon a pool of experts from a variety of fields, not limited to biology. The current list of OBI consortium members is available at the OBI consortium website. The consortium is made up of a coordinating committee which is a combination of two subgroups, the Community Representative (those representing a particular biomedical community) and the Core Developers (ontology developers who may or may not be members of any single community). Separate to the coordinating committee is the Developers Working Group which consists of developers within the communities collaborating in the development of OBI at the discretion of current OBI Consortium members.

== Papers on OBI ==
- Brinkman RR, Courtot M, Derom D, Fostel JM, He Y, Lord P, et al. (June 2010). "Modeling biomedical experimental processes with OBI". Journal of Biomedical Semantics. 1 (Suppl 1) S7. doi:10.1186/2041-1480-1-S1-S7. PMC 2903726. PMID 20626927.
- Courtot M, Bug WJ, Gibson F, Lister AL, Malone J, Schober D, Brinkman RR, Ruttenberg A (1 January 2008). The OWL of Biomedical Investigations. Proceedings of the Fifth Owled Workshop on Owl: Experiences and Directions. p. 432.
- Zheng J, Manduchi E, Stoeckert Jr CJ (7 July 2013). "Development of an Application Ontology for Beta Cell Genomics Based on the Ontology for Biomedical Investigations" (PDF). ICBO: 62–67. Archived from the original (PDF) on 16 January 2014.
- Dumontier M, Baker CJ, Baran J, Callahan A, Chepelev L, Cruz-Toledo J, et al. (March 2014). "The Semanticscience Integrated Ontology (SIO) for biomedical research and knowledge discovery". Journal of Biomedical Semantics. 5 (1) 14. doi:10.1186/2041-1480-5-14. PMC 4015691. PMID 24602174.
- Klingström T, Soldatova L, Stevens R, Roos TE, Swertz MA, Müller KM, et al. (January 2013). "Workshop on laboratory protocol standards for the Molecular Methods Database". New Biotechnology. 30 (2): 109–13. doi:10.1016/j.nbt.2012.05.019. PMID 22687389.
- Soldatova LN, King RD, Basu PS, Haddi E, Saunders N (October 2013). "The representation of biomedical protocols". EMBnet Journal. 19 (B): 56–8. doi:10.14806/ej.19.B.730.
