= BRENDA =

Online database of enzymes

BRENDA (Braunschweig Enzyme Database)

Content
- Description: Molecular and biochemical information on enzymes that have been classified by the IUBMB

Contact
- Research center: Leibniz Institute DSMZ, BRICS - Braunschweig Integrated Centre of Systems Biology
- Primary citation: PMID 33211880
- Release date: 2021

Access
- Website: http://www.brenda-enzymes.org
- Download URL: Download BRENDA
- Web service URL: SOAP access

BRENDA (BRaunschweig ENzyme DAtabase) is the world's most comprehensive online database for functional, biochemical and molecular biological data on enzymes, metabolites and metabolic pathways. It contains data on the properties, function and significance of all enzymes classified by the Enzyme Commission of the International Union of Biochemistry and Molecular Biology (IUBMB). As ELIXIR Core Data Resource and Global Core Biodata Resource, BRENDA is considered a data resource of critical importance to the international life sciences research community. The database compiles a representative overview of enzymes and metabolites using current research data from primary scientific literature and thus serves the purpose of facilitating information retrieval for researchers. BRENDA is subject to the terms of the Creative Commons license (CC BY 4.0), is accessible worldwide and can be used free of charge. As one of the digital resources of the Leibniz Institute DSMZ-German Collection of Microorganisms and Cell Cultures, BRENDA is part of the integrated biodata infrastructure DSMZ Digital Diversity.

== History ==
BRENDA was founded in 1987 by Dietmar Schomburg at the former German Research Centre for Biotechnology, now the Helmholtz Centre for Infection Research, in Braunschweig.

Schomburg's basic idea was to compile the most relevant enzyme data from the primary scientific literature in a standardized form in a generally accessible information system, thus making it easier for researchers to search the literature. He saw researchers facing a growing challenge in obtaining information, as the first large genome sequencing projects rapidly increased the amount of functional enzyme data, while information at that time still had to be extracted manually from printed publications in various journals.

Initially, the enzyme data was published as a series of books. Springerverlag published the first of nineteen editions of the "Springer Handbook of Enzymes" in 1990, which contained data on over 3000 EC classes. A second edition with 39 issues containing data on over 4900 EC classes was published from 2001 to 2009.

In 1996, Dietmar Schomburg accepted an appointment at the University of Cologne, where he and his working group further developed the data collection into a globally accessible, free online information system, which was available online in 1998 in the SRS system of the European Bioinformatics Institute (EBI) in 1998. In the following year, a separate full-text database was developed, which was accessible via the BRENDA website of the University of Cologne, in 2004 it was converted into a relational database. In 2007, Schomburg returned to the Technical University of Braunschweig. Since then, the BRENDA team has been based at the Braunschweig Center for Systems Biology (BRICS).

Since 2015, BRENDA has been part of de.NBI, the German network for bioinformatics infrastructure, and is part of the Center for Biological Data (BioData). In June 2018, BRENDA was included in the prestigious list of Core Data Resources maintained by ELIXIR, a European initiative for digital research infrastructure in biomedicine. In 2022, the database was also awarded Global Core Biodata Resource status by the Global Biodata Coalition. Since January 2023, BRENDA has been part of the Leibniz Institute DSMZ and receives permanent funding as part of the networked data services DSMZ Digital Diversity.

== Content and functionality ==
The BRENDA content basically covers organisms of all domains and is geared to the broad interest of the scientific community from different areas of life sciences such as systems biology, biotechnology, medicine and pharmaceuticals.

=== Enzyme Data ===
The enzyme-specific data in BRENDA are annotated from scientific literature and assigned an EC number (English: Enzyme Commission numbers). The EC numbers are part of a system established by the IUBMB that classifies enzymes according to their catalytic activity, i.e. the chemical reaction. The IUBMB Enzyme Commission has so far defined over 8300 EC numbers in seven main classes, all of which - including the obsolete ones - can be found in BRENDA. The data on all enzymes of an EC number are displayed on a common overview page (Enzyme Summary Page) and can be reduced to individual enzymes via filter options. The Enzyme Summary Page shows the name defined by the IUBMB for enzymes of this class, the reaction scheme that defines this enzyme class and a commentary by the Enzyme Commission. The information presented here also includes Enzyme nomenclature, substrates and products or the catalyzed reactions, inhibiting and activating ligands, enzyme structure, isolation and purification, enzyme stability, kinetic parameters, such as Km values and turnover numbers, the occurrence and intracellular localization as well as mutations.

The literature base of the data of an EC number can comprise several hundred publications if it contains medically or industrially relevant and thus well-studied enzymes. Each entry is linked to a literature reference and an organism from which the enzyme originates. If the protein sequence is known and has been published, entries are also assigned to a specific protein sequence in the UniProt database. BRENDA provides links to other online information systems to which the entries are linked. In addition to ExplorEnz, the enzyme information system of the IUBMB, these include DSMZ databases such as BacDive and CellDive, protein sequence and protein structure databases such as UniProt and PDB, literature databases such as PubMed and Europe PubMed Central and ontologies such as NCBI-MeSH.

=== Ligand data ===
In addition to the enzyme database, BRENDA contains a database with information on ligands, mostly low-molecular compounds that interact with enzymes. Depending on their role in enzymatic reactions, these are categorized as substrate, product, inhibitor, activator, cofactor or as metals and ions (if their function is not specified in the literature). These molecules can have different functions, e.g. they can be metabolites of primary metabolism, naturally occurring antibiotics or synthetic compounds used in the development of drugs or pesticides. All information on a ligand annotated in BRENDA can be accessed centrally on a summary page (Ligand Summary Page). The information presented here includes structural and molecular formula, InChIKey (International Chemical Identifier), synonyms and information on the role in enzymatic reactions including reaction equations and kinetic data such as inhibitor constants. Each entry is linked to a reference and an EC number.

=== Search options ===
The search bar on the homepage is used to quickly search for terms in specific data categories, while the Advanced Search function can be used to narrow down various search parameters and thus perform a targeted query. The Full-text Search enables an all-encompassing search of terms in all text fields of the database, including the comment fields, whose content is always visible on the Summary Pages, but can only be specifically queried using this search function.

Ligand data can be found not only by querying ligand names, but also by their structure. Via the search mask of the Ligand structure search, who developed the JavaScript-based JSME molecule editor, users can draw a chemical structure and search the BRENDA ligand database for substructures, isomers or similar structures.

In addition to these web browser-based query options, users can obtain the BRENDA data via SOAP-API or SBML download. The manually curated data can also be downloaded in JSON or txt format.

The BRENDA additional functions offer further ways to access the data.

=== Additional functions ===
In addition to the annotation of new data, BRENDA is constantly developing new database functions such as ontologies or visualizations, which open up further access paths to the data, show correlations and help to answer specific questions.

The BRENDA Tissue Ontology is a comprehensive and structured ontology with terms for tissues, organs, anatomical structures, plant parts, cell cultures, cell types and cell lines in organisms from all taxonomic groups in which enzymes can occur. It is a hierarchically organized set of controlled terms.

The BRENDA Metabolic Pathways graphically summarize the reaction equations annotated in BRENDA into metabolic pathways. They are drawn manually by the BRENDA curators. The BRENDA Metabolic Pathways visualize metabolic pathways that are largely described scientifically and whose reactions, enzymes and ligands can mostly be found in BRENDA. Search and filter functions can be used to highlight metabolic pathways, EC numbers or ligands (also organism-specific).

BRENDA also provides additional tools, the most important of which are described below.

- Word Maps: The Word Maps are compilations of terms that occur in connection with an enzyme name in headings and summaries of scientific publications. It is a visual representation of the connection between an EC number and associated terms from publications in the form of a tag cloud. They provide users with an initial overview of scientific content and findings related to this enzyme. The font size indicates how often a term occurs in connection with an EC number, the font color assigns the terms to the categories enzyme, tissue, intracellular occurrence, disease, organism, application and ligand.
- 3D Viewer: This function visualizes the 3D structure of an enzyme, i. e. the folding of the protein, and shows disulfide bonds, active sites, binding sites or regions and glycosylation sites.
- EC Explorer: The EC Explorer is a hierarchically categorized overview of all EC numbers from the IUBMB nomenclature list, including obsolete ones. The superordinate classes are displayed with a brief description, and IUBMB information such as nomenclature and main reaction is shown for the individual EC numbers.
- EnzymeDetector: The EnzymeDetector database provides a comparative and integrative approach for searching enzymatic annotations. The manually annotated and text mining data from BRENDA, UniProt, KEGG, PATRIC and NCBI's RefSeq, are integrated to provide a comprehensive overview of an organism. The data is complemented by self-performed predictions, e.g. BLAST against all enzyme annotations from Swiss-Prot and BrEPS enzyme pattern recognition.
- Genome Explorer: This tool visualizes genetic information of an enzyme and also shows the genetic context three genes upstream or downstream of the corresponding enzyme-encoding gene.
- Localization Prediction: This function uses protein sequence motifs to make a prediction about which subcellular compartment an enzyme is likely to occur in, including an assessment about the reliability of this prediction.
- Transmembrane Helices Prediction: This function uses protein sequence motifs to predict where an enzyme has transmembrane helices or is membrane-associated. It can also indicate all enzyme classes that are characterized by a certain number of transmembrane helices. It uses the membrane protein topology prediction method, which is based on a hidden Markov model.
- Taxonomic Tree: For the Taxonomic Tree, the organisms present in BRENDA are matched with NCBI and listed hierarchically. Organisms or superordinate taxonomic classes can be found here and organism-specific enzyme data can be retrieved via links.
- BKMS-react: BKMS-react is an integrated and non-redundant biochemical reaction database, which clearly summarizes different spellings of known enzyme-catalyzed and spontaneous reactions from BRENDA, KEGG, MetaCyc and SABIO-RK.
- CUPSAT: The Cologne University Protein Stability Analysis Tool (CUPSAT) is an instrument for predicting changes in protein stability in point mutations. The prediction model uses amino acid atomic potentials and the torsion angle distribution to evaluate the amino acid environment of the mutation site. In addition, the prediction model can distinguish the amino acid environment based on its solvent accessibility and secondary structure specificity.

== Annotation ==
=== Manual annotation ===
The data in BRENDA comes from primary scientific literature. The process of integrating new data begins with a manual literature search in PubMed and Scopus and the selection of relevant, qualitative and comprehensive publications. From these, data is annotated and the result is then double-checked qualitatively. All these steps are carried out manually by scientific staff with relevant expertise. At the same time, the structural formulas of the ligands are created and curated manually. After curation, the data undergo several hundred computer-aided checks to verify the formal correctness of the data as part of the integration into the database. New data is published twice a year on the BRENDA website.

The seven EC classes are not updated in parallel, but periodically one after the other. For data of newly described enzymes that do not match any existing EC number, new BRENDA-internal EC numbers are created that contain the capital letter "B" before the last digit. These are provisional auxiliary enzyme classes that have not yet been officially approved by the IUBMB. As soon as a sufficient amount of reliable scientific data on a B-number has been annotated in BRENDA, BRENDA staff submit it to the IUBMB Enzyme Commission as a new proposal for review. The BRENDA curators are themselves part of the IUBMB Nomenclature Committee. New EC numbers are immediately added to the BRENDA database and published online with the next release.

=== Text mining ===
Due to the manual and selective annotation process, the literature base and the associated amount of data in BRENDA is quantitatively limited. In 2006, a computer-aided information retrieval function (text mining) was established to expand the manually curated data core. Computer-aided methods search the specialist literature available online and automatically annotate certain information in the corresponding data categories. Four text mining information systems can be used in BRENDA: FRENDA (Full Reference ENzyme DAta), AMENDA (Automatic Mining of ENzyme DAta), DRENDA (Disease-Related ENzyme information DAtabase) and KENDA (Kinetic ENzyme DAta). The PubMed literature database serves as the basis for text mining. In order to obtain the information relevant for BRENDA, all titles and summaries of scientific articles in PubMed are searched for specific text modules and terms, saved and processed for BRENDA. There is no quality control of the data acquired by text mining by the BRENDA staff, but the AMENDA results include an automatic qualitative assessment that supports users in assessing the scientific quality of the results.
