= Phenoscape =

Phenoscape is a project to develop a database of phenotype data for species across the Ostariophysi, a large group of teleost fish. The data is captured using annotations that combine terms from an anatomy ontology, an accompanying taxonomic ontology, and quality terms from the PATO ontology of phenotype qualities. Several other OBO ontologies are also used. The anatomy ontology was developed from the zebrafish anatomy ontology developed by the Zebrafish Information Network.
