= National Centers for Biomedical Computing =

NIH center

The National Centers for Biomedical Computing (NCBCs) are part of the U.S. National Institutes of Health plan to develop and implement the core of a universal computing infrastructure that is urgently needed to speed progress in biomedical research. Their mission is to create innovative software programs and other tools that will enable the biomedical community to integrate, analyze, model, simulate, and share data on human health and disease.

Recognizing the potential benefits to human health that can be realized from applying and advancing the field of biomedical computing, the Biomedical Information Science and Technology Initiative (BISTI) was launched at the NIH in April 2000. This initiative is aimed at making optimal use of computer science and technology to address problems in biology and medicine. The full text of the original BISTI Report is available.

As of April 2016, the web site for the National Centers for Biomedical Computing (http://www.ncbcs.org) is no longer managed by that organization, though many of the centers still are supported.

== Current Centers ==
- Center for Computational Biology
- National Center for Biomedical Ontology
- Simbios: Physics-based Simulation of Biological Structures, Stanford University
- National Center for Integrative Biomedical Informatics
- National Center for Multi-Scale Study of Cellular Networks
- National Alliance for Medical Imaging Computing

== See also ==
- Biositemaps
- Biomedical Computation Review, a quarterly magazine created by Simbios to help build community among the diverse disciplines that participate in the field.
