= Eagle-i =

The eagle-i network (or just eagle-i) was a tool developed by a set of institutions from the United States that enables users to locate scientific resources around their country. It was retired November 4, 2021 after more than a decade in service. It used an ontology to map the resources (such as scientific equipment) to their location, facilitating reuse and collaboration. The eagle-i team has produced ontologies that take care of different kinds of resources, such as the Reagent Application Ontology.
