= Plant ontology =

Plant Ontology

Content
- Description: The Plant Ontology
- Data types captured: Anatomy and development of plants
- Organisms: Viridiplantae

Contact
- Primary citation: Walls et al. (2012)
- Release date: 2002

Access
- Data format: OBO and OWL
- Website: http://plantontology.org
- Download URL: http://purl.obolibrary.org/obo/po.owl
- Sparql endpoint: http://sparql.hegroup.org/sparql

Miscellaneous
- License: CC BY 4.0

Plant ontology (PO) is a collection of ontologies developed by the Plant Ontology Consortium. These ontologies describe anatomical structures and growth and developmental stages across Viridiplantae. The PO is intended for multiple applications, including genetics, genomics, phenomics, and development, taxonomy and systematics, semantic applications and education.

== Project Members ==
- Oregon State University
- New York Botanical Garden
- L. H. Bailey Hortorium at Cornell University
- Ensembl
- SoyBase
- SSWAP
- SGN
- Gramene
- The Arabidopsis Information Resource (TAIR)
- MaizeGDB
- University of Missouri at St. Louis
- Missouri Botanical Garden

== See also ==
- Generic Model Organism Database
- Open Biomedical Ontologies
- OBO Foundry
