= FGED Society =

Bioinformatics association

- Abbreviation: FGED
- Formation: November 1999; 27 years ago
- Dissolved: September 2021; 5 years ago
- Type: NPO
- Purpose: Scientific
- Official language: English
- President: Francis Ouellette
- Main organ: Board of directors
- Website: www.fged.org

The Functional GEnomics Data Society (FGED) (formerly known as the MGED Society) was a non-profit, volunteer-run international organization of biologists, computer scientists, and data analysts that aims to facilitate biological and biomedical discovery through data integration. The approach of FGED was to promote the sharing of basic research data generated primarily via high-throughput technologies that generate large data sets within the domain of functional genomics.

Members of the FGED Society worked with other organizations to support the effective sharing and reproducibility of functional genomics data; facilitate the creation of standards and software tools that leverage the standards; and promote the sharing of high quality, well annotated data within the life sciences and biomedical communities.

Founded in 1999 as the "Microarray Gene Expression Data (MGED) Society", this organization changed its name to the "Functional Genomics Data Society" in 2010 to reflect the fact that it has broadened its focus beyond the application of DNA microarrays for gene expression analysis to include technologies such as high-throughput sequencing. The scope of the FGED Society includes data generated using any functional genomics technology when applied to genome-scale studies of gene expression, binding, modification and other related applications.

In September 2021, the FGED Society ceased operations.

== History ==
The FGED Society was formed in 1999 at a meeting on Microarray Gene Expression Databases in recognition of the need to establish standards for sharing and storing data from DNA microarray experiments. Originally named the "MGED Society," the society began with a focus on DNA microarrays and gene expression data.

The original MGED Society was incorporated in 2002 as a non-profit public benefit organization with the title Microarray Gene Expression Data Society and obtained permanent charity status in 2007. The MGED name was legally changed in 2007 to Microarray and Gene Expression Data Society to emphasize a broader scope.

In September 2008, the Society decided to promote itself simply as the MGED Society to broaden the Society's scope beyond microarray technology and gene expression applications, yet still retain the recognized value of the MGED name within the community.

In July 2010, the society voted to change its name to the "Functional Genomics Data (FGED) Society" to reflect its current mission which goes beyond microarrays and gene expression to encompass data generated using any functional genomics technology applied to genomic-scale studies of gene expression, binding, modification (such as DNA methylation), and other related applications. This was formally announced on 14 July 2010 at the society's "MGED13" annual meeting.

=== Presidents of the FGED Society ===
Board members and officers of the FGED Society are elected annually each May and start serving in June. Presidents of the FGED Society along with their terms in office are as follows:

- Francis Ouellette (2013–2021)
- John Quackenbush (2011–2013)
- Chris Stoeckert (2007–2011)
- Catherine Ball (2003–2007)
- Alvis Brasma (1999–2003)

== Membership ==
The FGED Board of Directors and Advisory Board consist of volunteers from academia, industry, government, and journals representing a cross-section of those generating, analyzing, archiving, and publishing in the functional genomics area. Although there is no formal membership, the attendees of the annual FGED meetings are considered to be part of the FGED community.

== Standards ==
To date, FGED has produced a variety of standards specifications pertaining to DNA microarray experiments. These standards are designed to improve the annotation, communication, and sharing of data and findings from such experiments within the life science research community.

=== MINSEQE ===
Minimal Information about a high-throughput SEQuencing Experiment (MINSEQE) is a data content minimum information standard that describes the essential information needed to adequately document a high-throughput sequencing experiment for the purpose of interpretation and replication of the results.

=== MIAME ===
MIAME (Minimal Information About a Microarray Experiment) is a data content standard that describes the essential information needed to adequately document a DNA microarray experiment for the purpose of interpretation and replication of the results. It was the first published example of a minimum information standard for high-throughput experiments in the life sciences, and, as such, laid the groundwork for similar standards in other bioscience domains.

=== MAGE-OM and MAGE-TAB ===
MAGE-OM (MicroArray Gene Expression Object Model) is a data exchange and data modeling standard for use in encoding data from microarray experiments for the purpose of export and import into software tools and databases via XML files. MAGE-OM is a platform-independent model implemented in the XML-based MAGE-ML format.

A new version, MAGE-TAB, was developed to be easier to understand and generate by data producers as it is in a format (tab-delimited) that can be viewed and edited using widely available spreadsheet software, such as Microsoft Excel.

=== MGED Ontology ===
The MGED Ontology (MO) provides a standard terminology for describing components of a DNA microarray experiment. The Ontology for Biomedical Investigations (OBI) is being developed as a replacement for the MO. A mapping of ontology terms from MO to OBI is available.

== Annual meeting ==
A major component of the FGED Society effort has been the annual FGED meeting to showcase cutting-edge scientific work and promote standards.

The FGED Society has held its annual meeting at venues around the world since 1999, coordinating with a local scientific organization that provides space for talks, poster sessions, workshops, and tutorials.

=== Past meetings of the FGED Society ===
Here is a list of the annual meeting dates and locations for past meetings of the FGED Society. All meetings from 2010 and prior were held under the name "MGED Society".

Date	Location
20 June 2013	Seattle, WA, USA
25 January 2012	Boston, Massachusetts, USA
15 July 2010	Boston, Massachusetts, USA (in conjunction with ISMB)
8 October 2009	Phoenix, Arizona, USA
5 September 2008	Riva del Garda, Trentino, Italy
5 September 2007	Brisbane, Australia
10 September 2006	Seattle, WA, USA
13 September 2005	Bergen, Norway
10 September 2004	Toronto, Canada
5 September 2003	Aix-en-Provence, France
27 September 2002	Plaza Heisei, Odaiba, Tokyo, Japan
31 March 2001	Stanford University, CA, USA
27 May 2000	DKFZ and EMBL, Heidelberg, Germany
15 November 1999	EBI, Cambridge, UK

== See also ==
- Minimum Information Standards
- Genomic Standards Consortium
