= National Center for Biomedical Ontology =

US research center

The National Center for Biomedical Ontology (NCBO) was founded in 2006 and is one of the National Centers for Biomedical Computing, and is funded by the NIH. Among the goals of the NCBO is to provide tools for the discovery and access of biomedical ontologies, which are a type of controlled vocabulary designed to allow the expression of complex relationships in machine-readable form.

The NCBO has facilities at Stanford University, the Mayo Clinic, the University of Victoria, and the University at Buffalo.

Among the products associated with the NCBO are the Open Biomedical Ontologies, and the BioPortal, a web-based resource forum that makes available for research more than 270 of the world’s biomedical ontologies and terminologies.
