= Minimum information about a microarray experiment =

Minimum information about a microarray experiment (MIAME) is a standard created by the FGED Society for reporting microarray experiments.

MIAME is intended to specify all the information necessary to interpret the results of the experiment unambiguously and to potentially reproduce the experiment. While the standard defines the content required for compliant reports, it does not specify the format in which this data should be presented. MIAME describes the minimum information required to ensure that microarray data can be easily interpreted and that results derived from its analysis can be independently verified. There are a number of file formats used to represent this data, as well as both public and subscription-based repositories for such experiments. Additionally, software exists to aid the preparation of MIAME-compliant reports.

MIAME revolves around six key components: raw data, normalized data, sample annotations, experimental design, array annotations, and data protocols.
