= SILVA ribosomal RNA database =

SILVA is a ribosomal RNA database established in collaboration between the Microbial Genomics Group at the Max Planck Institute for Marine Microbiology in Bremen, Germany, the Department of Microbiology at the Technical University of Munich, and Ribocon.

Release 117 of the database (January 2014) held more than 4,000,000 small subunit (SSU - 16S/18S) and 400,000 large subunit (LSU - 23S/28S) sequences. Sequences are provided as files for the ARB software environment.

== See also ==
- List of biological databases § RNA databases
