= ELIXIR =

European organized network of life science laboratories

- Mission statement: We enable scientists to access and analyse life science data
- Location: Austria (Observer); Belgium; Croatia (Observer); Czech Republic; Denmark; Estonia; Finland; France; Germany; Greece; Hungary; Israel; Ireland; Italy; Latvia (Observer); Luxembourg; Malta; The Netherlands; Norway; Poland (Observer); Portugal; Slovakia; Slovenia; Spain; Sweden; Switzerland; United Kingdom
- Established: December 13, 2013
- Website: www.elixir-europe.org

ELIXIR (the European life sciences infrastructure for biological information) is an initiative that allows life science researchers across Europe to share and store their research data as part of an organised network. Its goal is to bring together data and software experts from Europe's research organisations and data centres to help coordinate the collection, quality control and storage of large amounts of biological data produced by life science experiments. ELIXIR aims to ensure that biological data is integrated into a federated system easily accessible by the scientific community.

== Mission ==
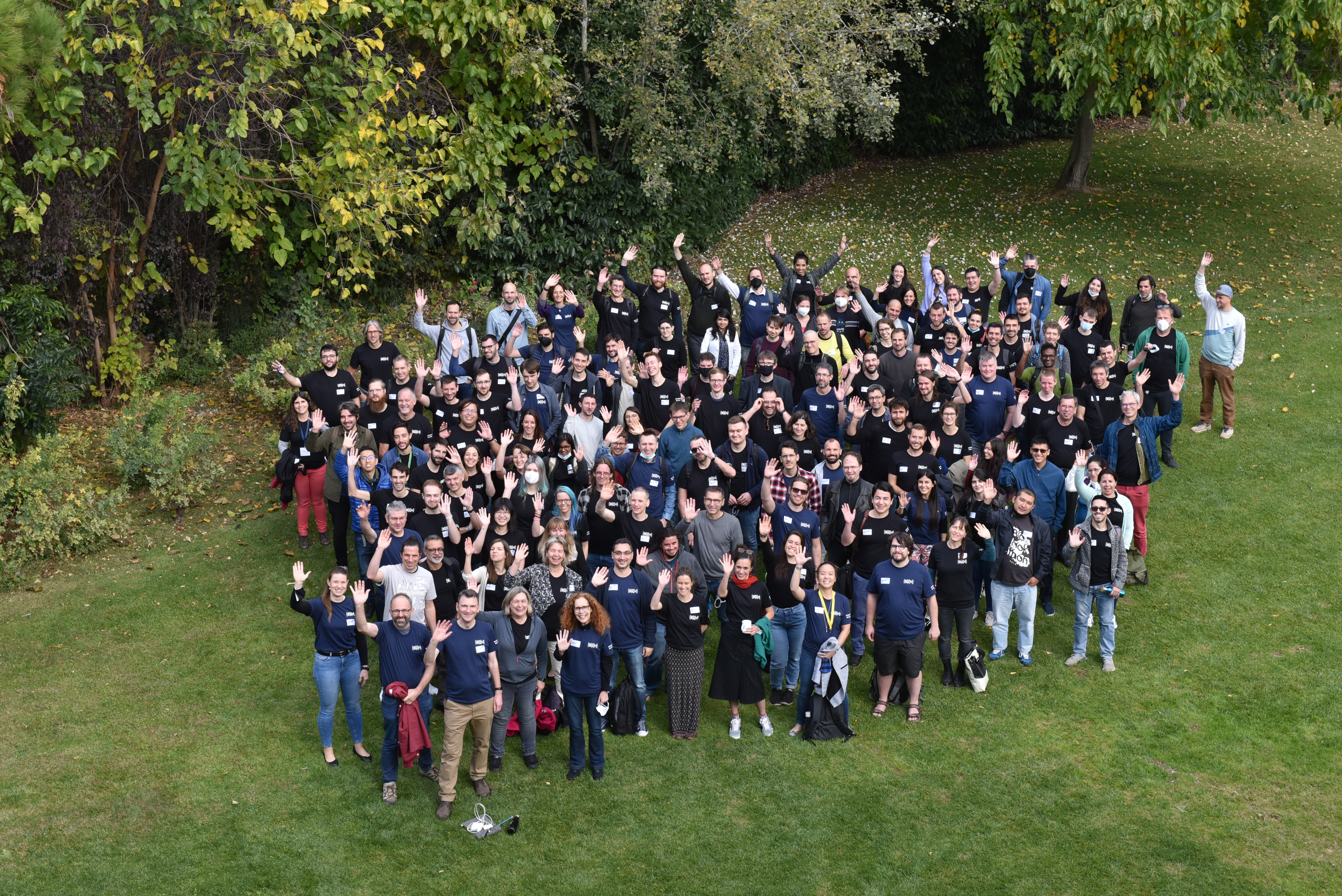
Participants of a hackathon organized by ELIXIR in Terrassa

ELIXIR's mission is to build a sustainable European infrastructure for biological information, supporting life science research and its translation to medicine and the environment, the bio-industries and society.

The results from biological experiments produce vast amounts of results that are stored as data using computer software. European countries have invested heavily in research that produces, analyses and stores biological information. However, the collection, storage, archiving and integration of these large amounts of data presents a problem that cannot be tackled by one country alone. ELIXIR is a European community of data and software experts, working together to sustain an integrated network that addresses the complex problem of biological data storage and management. By providing a sustainable and distributed structure for handling data and data retrieval tools, ELIXIR hopes to promote Europe-wide investment in bioinformatics, providing the stability to conduct research in all areas of life science, both in academia and industry.

== Organisation and structure ==
ELIXIR is an inter-governmental organisation which brings together existing bioinformatics resources. It is coordinated by the ELIXIR Hub, based alongside the European Bioinformatics Institute of the European Molecular Biology Laboratory (EMBL-EBI) on the Wellcome Trust Genome Campus in Hinxton, Cambridge.

The members of the ELIXIR consortium are European countries, represented by their governments and ministries; the scientific community in each member country develops their national Node, which operates the services and resources that are part of ELIXIR. Each ELIXIR Node is itself a network of national life science organisations, coordinated by a lead institute.

European Molecular Biology Laboratory is an intergovernmental organisation so it is the only Node that is not associated with a country.

ELIXIR focuses efforts around five central areas of activity, referred to as Platforms. These cover Data, Tools, Compute, Interoperability and Training. Work in these areas is intended to improve access to open data resources and tools by improving connectivity, discoverability and access to computational power, as well as developing training for users and service providers to meet these aims.

ELIXIR supports users addressing the Grand Challenges in life science research across diverse domains. ELIXIR supports a range of self-selected Communities, which focus on high-level topics such as ‘Human Data’ and ‘Plant Sciences’ to more specific and focused disciplines such as ‘Metabolomics’ and ‘Intrinsically Disordered Proteins’, as well as a community dedicated to the ‘Galaxy’ resource. These communities are in place to develop bioinformatic and data standards, services and training that are required to facilitate that community to reach their scientific goals.

=== Participants ===
As of June 2026 the following countries and EMBL-EBI have signed the ELIXIR Consortium Agreement (ECA) in order to become a member of ELIXIR: Belgium, Czech Republic, Denmark, Estonia, Finland, France, Germany, Greece, Hungary, Ireland, Israel, Italy, Luxembourg, Malta, the Netherlands, Norway, Portugal, Slovakia, Slovenia, Spain, Sweden, Switzerland, and the United Kingdom.

Austria, Croatia, Latvia and Poland are Observer countries, working towards ratifying the ECA in the near future.

Countries that have signed the ECA are allocated representation on the ELIXIR Board.

The preparatory phase of ELIXIR was coordinated by Professor Dame Janet Thornton of EMBL-EBI. The Founding Director of ELIXIR, Dr Niklas Blomberg, took up his position in the new ELIXIR Hub in Cambridge in May 2013. He left ELIXIR in December 2023 and Prof Tim Hubbard was appointed Director in March 2024.

== Funding ==
By the end of 2012 ELIXIR completed its five-year preparatory phase funded by the EU's Seventh Framework Programme as part of the European Strategy Forum on Research Infrastructures (ESFRI) process.

In 2015 ELIXIR was awarded €19 Million HORIZON 2020 funding to run the EXCELERATE project, this was followed by the CONVERGE project in 2020. Both projects enabled ELIXIR to coordinate and extend national and international data resources. ELIXIR has also set up collaborations to apply for other large scale funding for other EU projects, in which it is also involved in an organisational capacity, for example for the CORBEL, FAIRplus, EOSC-Life, B1MG, GDI and BY-COVID projects.

Each member state jointly contributes towards the funding of the ELIXIR Hub in proportion to their GDP. Some countries have allocated new funds to contribute towards their ELIXIR Node. The services and activities of the ELIXIR Nodes will continue to be funded by national agencies. Collectively, ELIXIR members will apply for additional external funding.

In 2024, ELIXIR commenced its fourth five-year scientific programme.
