= Graner =

Graner may refer to:

- Charles Graner (born 1968), U.S. Army reservist involved in the Abu Ghraib prisoner abuse scandal.
- Jim Graner (1919–1976), Cleveland sportscaster.
- Cláudia Graner (born 1974), female Brazilian water polo player.
- Sheri Graner Ray, computer game designer.
- Milo Machado-Graner (born 2008), French actor
- Cellular Potts model (also known as the Glazier and Graner model), a lattice-based computational modeling method to simulate the collective behavior of cellular structures.
