= Macromolecular complex =

Macromolecular complex may refer to:

- Coordination complex, also called macromolecular metal complex, is a complex of atom or usually metallic ion and a surrounding array of bound molecules or anions, which are known as ligands. In bioinorganic chemistry the ligands are the side chains of proteins or cofactors like porphyrins
- Biomolecular complex, a complex of biological polymers (protein, RNA, DNA, or a combination of them). Macromolecular complexes are structures that lack lipid membrane boundaries. These complexes carry out essential process on the cell.
