= Pedro Mendes (scientist) =

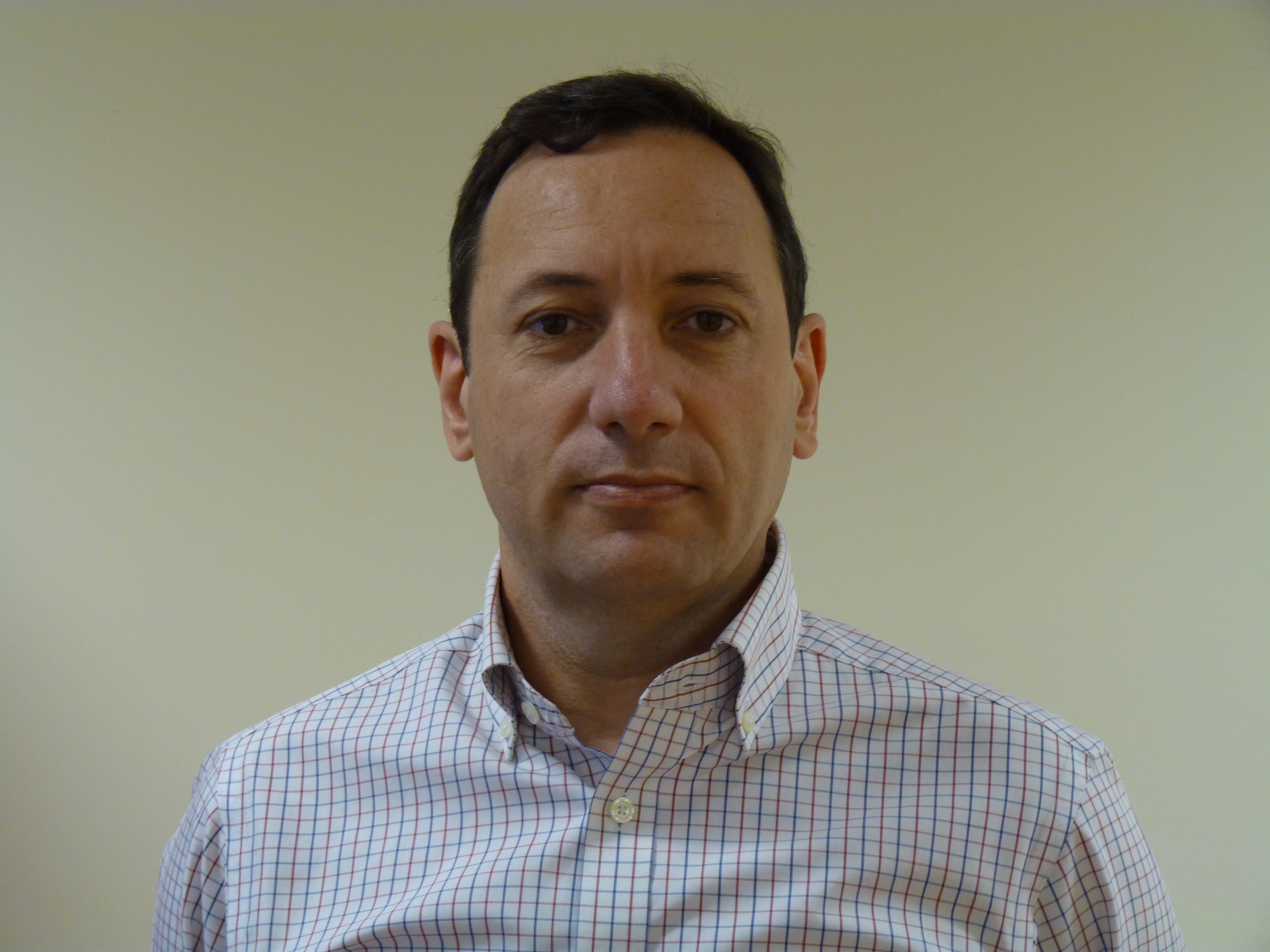
- Born: Pedro Pedrosa Mendes
- Education: University of Lisbon (Lic); Aberystwyth University (PhD)
- Known for: GEPASI; COPASI; Systems Biology Markup Language (SBML); MIRIAM
- Scientific career
- Fields: Systems biology; Biochemistry; Machine learning; Bioinformatics
- Workplaces: University of Connecticut Health Center; University of Manchester; Virginia Tech (VT); Virginia Bioinformatics Institute (VBI); National Center for Genome Resources; Aberystwyth University
- Thesis: Computer simulation of the dynamics of biochemical pathways (1994)
- Doctoral advisor: Douglas Kell
- Website: www.comp-sys-bio.org; twitter.com/gepasi; manchester.ac.uk/research/pedro.mendes/

Pedro Pedrosa Mendes is a professor of computational systems biology in the Department of Computer Science at the University of Manchester. He is a member of the Manchester Centre for Integrative Systems Biology (MCISB), the Machine Learning and Optimization (MLO) group. He is also a professor at the University of Connecticut Health Center.

== Education ==
Mendes did his undergraduate degree in biochemistry at the University of Lisbon. He then moved to the UK and was awarded a Doctor of Philosophy from Aberystwyth University in 1994 for work on computer simulation of metabolic pathways.

== Career ==
Following his PhD, Mendes moved to the National Center for Genome Resources for a year then on to the Virginia Bioinformatics Institute (VBI) of Virginia Polytechnic Institute and State University (Virginia Tech or VT) in 2000. He moved to the University of Manchester as Professor in 2007, while still keeping a 20% appointment in the VBI until the end of 2013. In January 2014 he joined the Center for Quantitative Medicine at the University of Connecticut Health Center and he split his time 50/50 with the appointment at the University of Manchester. From July 2016 he transitioned to a full time position at the University of Connecticut Health Center as Professor of Cell Biology. He is a speaker of the IBS Biomedical Mathematics Group.
