= List of systems biology modeling software =

Systems biology relies heavily on building mathematical models to help understand and make predictions of biological processes. Specialized software to assist in building models has been developed since the arrival of the first digital computers. The following list gives the currently supported software applications available to researchers.

The vast majority of modern systems biology modeling software support SBML, which is the de facto standard for exchanging models of biological cellular processes. Some tools also support CellML, a standard used for representing physiological processes. The advantage of using standard formats is that even though a particular software application may eventually become unsupported and even unusable, the models developed by that application can be easily transferred to more modern equivalents. This allows scientific research to be reproducible long after the original publication of the work.

To obtain more information about a particular tool, click on the name of the tool. This will direct you either to a peer-reviewed publication or, in some rare cases, to a dedicated Wikipedia page.

== Actively supported open-source software applications ==
=== General information ===
When an entry in the SBML column states "Yes, but only for reactions.", it means that the tool only supports the reaction component of SBML. For example, rules, events, etc. are not supported.

Name	Description/Notability	OS	License	Site	SBML Support
iBioSim	iBioSim is a computer-aided design (CAD) tool for the modeling, analysis, and design of genetic circuits.	multiplatform (Java/C++)	Apache License		Yes
CompuCell3D	GUI/Scripting tool for building and simulating multicellular models.	multiplatform (C++/Python)	MIT		Yes, but only for reactions.
COPASI	GUI tool for analyzing and simulating SBML models.	multiplatform (C++)	Artistic License		Yes
Cytosim	Spatial simulator for flexible cytoskeletal filaments and motor proteins	Mac, Linux, Cygwin (C++)	GPL3		Not applicable
Libroadrunner	High-performance software library for simulation and analysis of SBML models	multiplatform (C/C++)	Apache License		Yes
massPy	Simulation tool that can work with COBRApy	multiplatform (Python)	MIT		Yes
MCell	GUI tool for particle-based spatial stochastic simulation with individual molecules	multiplatform	MIT and GPLv2		Not applicable
OpenCOR	A cross-platform modelling environment, which is aimed at organizing, editing, simulating, and analysing CellML files on Windows, Linux and macOS.	multiplatform (C++/Python)	GPLv3		Uses CellML
PhysiBoSS	A specialized form of the PhysiCell agent-based modeling platform that directly integrates Boolean signaling networks into cell Agents	multiplatform (C++)	BSD-3		Yes, but only for reactions
PhysiCell	A agent-based modeling framework for multicellular systems biology.	multiplatform (C++)	BSD-3		Yes, but only for reactions
PolyHoop	Mesh-based program for the dynamic simulation of cellular tissue mechanics in 2D with topological transitions	multiplatform (C++)	BSD-3		Not applicable
PolyMorph	Program for the dynamic simulation of cellular tissue mechanics in 2D coupled to chemical signaling	multiplatform (C++)	BSD-3		Not applicable
PySCeS	Python tool for modeling and analyzing SBML models	multiplatform (Python)	BSD-3		Yes
pySB	Python-based platform with specialization in rule-based models.	multiplatform (Python)	BSD-3		Partial
ReaDDy	Particle-based spatial simulator with intermolecular potentials	Linux and Mac	Custom		Not applicable
SBSCL	Java library with efficient and exhaustive support for SBML	multiplatform (Java)	LGPL		Yes
SBW (software)	A distributed workbench that includes many modeling tools	multiplatform (C/C++)	BSD-3		Yes
SimuCell3D	Mesh-based modeling framework for the dynamic simulation of cellular tissue mechanics in 3D with polarized cells	multiplatform (C++)	BSD-3		Not applicable
Smoldyn	Particle-based simulator for spatial stochastic simulations with individual molecules	multiplatform (C/C++/Python)	LGPL		Not applicable
Spatiocyte	Spatial modeling software that uses a fine lattice with up to one molecule per site	multiplatform	Unknown		Not applicable
SpringSaLaD	Particle-based spatial simulator in which molecules are spheres that are linked by springs	multiplatform	Unknown		Not applicable
STEPS	Stochastic reaction-diffusion and membrane potential solver on distributed meshes	multiplatform (C++/Python)	GPLv2		Partial
Tellurium (software)	Simulation environment, that packages multiple libraries into one platform.	multiplatform (Python)	Apache License		Yes
URDME	Stochastic reaction-diffusion simulation on unstructured meshes	MatLab on Mac, Linux	GPL3		Not applicable
VCell	Comprehensive modeling platform for non-spatial, spatial, deterministic and stochastic simulations, including both reaction networks and reaction rules.	multiplatform (Java)	MIT		Yes

== Specialist Tools ==
The following table lists specialist tools that cannot be grouped with the modeling tools.

Name	Description/Notability	OS	License	Site
PySCeSToolbox	PySCeSToolbox is a set of metabolic model analysis tools. Among other features, it can be used to generate the control analysis equations that relate the elasticities to the control coefficients. The package is cross-platform and requires PySCeS and Maxima to operate.	multiplatform (C++/Python)	BSD-3	
MassChargeCuration (MCC)	MCC is a Python tool for automatically curating mass and charge assignments for metabolites in metabolic network modelling that requires Microsoft Research's Z3 to run.	multiplatform (Python)	MIT License	

== Feature Tables ==
=== Supported modeling paradigms ===
Name	ODE	Constraint based	Stochastic	Logical	Agent based	Spatial (particle)	Spatial (continuous)
iBioSim	Yes	No	Yes	No	Limited	No	No
CompuCell3D	Yes	No	No	No	Yes	No	Yes
COPASI	Yes	No	Yes	No	No	No	No
Cytosim	No	No	Yes	No	?	Yes	?
libRoadRunner	Yes	No	Yes	No	No	No	No
massPy	Uses libRoadRunner	Uses COBRApy	No	No	No	No	
MCell	No	No	Yes	No	No	Yes	No
OpenCOR	Yes	No	No	No	No	No	No
PhysiBoSS							
PhysiCell	Uses libRoadRunner	No	No	No	Yes	?	Yes
PySCeS	Yes	No	?	No	No	No	No
pySB	Yes	No	No	No	No	No	No
ReaDDy							
SBSCL	Yes	Yes	Yes	No	No	No	No
SBW	Yes	No	Yes	No	No	No	No
Smoldyn	No	No	Yes	No	No	Yes	No
Spatiocyte							
SpringSaLaD							
STEPS							
Tellurium (software)	Uses libRoadRunner						
URDME							
VCell	Yes	No	?	No	No	No	Single Cell

=== Differential equation specific features ===
Name	Non-stiff solver	Stiff solver	Steady-state solver	Steady-state sensitivities	Time-dependent sensitivities	Bifurcation Analysis
iBioSim	Yes	Yes	No	No	?	No
CompuCell3D	Uses libRoadRunner					NA
COPASI	Yes	Yes	Yes	Yes	?	Limited
libRoadRunner	Yes	Yes	Yes	Yes	Yes	via AUTO2000 plugin
masspy	Uses libRoadRunner					
OpenCOR	Yes	Yes	?	?	?	No
PhysiBoSS
PhysiCell	Uses libRoadRunner					
PySCeS	Yes	Yes	Yes	Yes	?	Limited+
pySB	Yes	No	No	No	No	No
SBSCL	Yes	Yes	Yes			
SBW	Uses C# edition of roadrunner					Yes
Tellurium (software)	Uses libRoadRunner					
VCell	Yes	Yes	No	No	No	No

=== File format support and interface type ===
Name	Import	Export	Primary Interface	Network visualization (editing)
iBioSim	SBML	SBML	GUI	Yes (Yes)
CompuCell3D	Native XML specification format and SBML	Native XML	GUI/Python scripting	No
COPASI	Native XML specification format and SBML	Native XML and SBML	GUI	Yes (No)
libRoadRunner	SBML	SBML	Python scripting	No
masspy	SBML	SBML	Python scripting	No

=== Advanced features (where applicable) ===
Name	Stoichiometry matrix	Reduced stoich matrix	Conserved moiety analysis	Jacobian	MCA
COPASI	Yes	Yes	Yes	Yes	Yes
libRoadRunner	Yes	Yes	Yes	Yes	Yes
masspy	via libRoadRunner				
PySCeS	Yes	Yes	Yes	Yes	Yes
VCell	?	?	?	?	Limited

=== Other features ===
Name	Parameter Estimation	DAE support	Units support
iBioSim	No	?	?
ComputeCell3D	NA	NA	?
COPASI	Yes	Limited	Yes
libRoadRunner	via Python packages	Limited	Yes
masspy	via Python packages	Limited	Yes
SBSCL	No	Yes	Yes

== Particle-based simulators ==
Particle based simulators treat each molecule of interest as an individual particle in continuous space, simulating molecular diffusion, molecule-membrane interactions and chemical reactions.

=== Comparison of particle-based simulators ===
The following list compares the features for several particle-based simulators. This table is edited from a version that was originally published in the Encyclopedia of Computational Neuroscience. System boundaries codes: R = reflecting, A = absorbing, T = transmitting, P = periodic, and I = interacting. * Algorithm is exact but software produced incorrect results at the time of original table compilation. † These benchmark run times are not comparable with others due to differing levels of detail.

Feature	MCell	Smoldyn	eGFRD	SpringSaLaD	ReaDDy
Time steps	~1 us	ns to ms	event-based	~10 ns	~0.1 ns to us
Molecules	points	points, spheres	spheres	multi-spheres	multi-spheres
Dimensions	2,3	1,2,3	3	3	3
System boundaries	R,A,P,T	R,A,P,T	P	R	P,I
Surfaces	triangle mesh	many primitives	-	1 flat surface	plane, sphere
Surface molecules	1/tile, 2 states	unlimited, 4 states	-	unlimited, 3 states	-
Excluded volume	-	excellent	exact	good	excellent
Multimers	states only	rule-based model	-	explicit	explicit
Allostery	-	yes	-	yes	-
Reaction accuracy	very good	excellent	exact*	excellent	excellent
Dissociation products	stochastic	fixed separation	adjacent	adjacent	adjacent
Molecule-surface interactions	good	excellent	-	to sites only	potentials
Long-range interactions	-	yes	-	-	yes
Benchmark run time	67 s	22 s	13 days†	9.1 months†	13 minutes
Distribution	executable	executable	self-compile	Java file	self-compile
User interface	GUI, text	text	text	GUI	Python script
Graphical output	excellent	good	partial support	partial support	good
Library interface	Python	C/C++, Python	-	-	Python
References					

== Model calibration software ==
Model calibration is a key activity when developing systems biology models. This table highlights some of the current model calibration tools available to systems biology modelers. The first table list tools that are SBML compatible.

Tool	PEtab Compatible	P1	P2
pyPESTO	Yes	NA	NA
COPASI	Yes	NA	NA

PEtab is a community standard for specifying model calibration runs.

== Legacy open-source software applications ==
The following list some very early software for modeling biochemical systems that were developed pre-1980s There are listed for historical interest.

Name	Description/Notability	Language	Terminus ante quem
BIOSIM	The first ever recorded digital simulator of biochemical networks (by David Garfinkel)	FORTRAN IV	1968
KDF 9	First simulator to support MCA. Developed by the late Jim Burns in Edinburgh	Early form of FORTRAN	1968
METASIM	Early simulator by Park and Wright	PL/1	1973

The following list shows some of the software modeling applications that were developed in the 1980s and 1990s. There are listed for historical interest.

Name	Description/Notability	Language	SBML Support	Terminus ante quem
COR	First public CellML-based environment.	Object Pascal	Uses CellML	2010
DBsolve	Early GUI based simulation platform.	C/C++	No	1999
E-Cell	One of the earliest attempts at a whole-cell modeling platform.	C/C++	No	1999
Gepasi	First GUI application that supported metabolic control analysis and parameter estimation.	C/C++	Yes	1993
Jarnac	First GUI based application to support scripting in systems biology modeling.	Object Pascal	Yes	2000
JSim	First Java-based systems biology modeling platform	Java	Yes	2003
MetaMod	One of the first PC-based systems biology simulators	BBC Micro	No	1986
MetaModel	Early PC-based systems biology simulator	Turbo Pascal 5.0	No	1991
MIST	GUI based simulator	Borland Pascal 7.0	No	1995
SCAMP	First application to support metabolic control analysis and simulation on a PC	Pascal, later in C	No	1985 (Thesis)
