= James A. Glazier =

American scientist (born 1962)

- Born: June 1962 (age 64)
- Education: Harvard University (BA) University of Chicago (MA, PhD)
- Scientific career
- Workplaces: Indiana University
- Thesis: Dynamics of Cellular Patterns
- Academic advisors: Albert Libchaber
- Doctoral students: Arpita Upadhyaya

James Alexander Glazier (born June 27, 1962) is a biophysicist and bioengineer, author, and educator best known for his contributions to the field of multiscale modeling, pattern formation, and morphogenesis in biological systems. Glazier has published numerous articles in leading scientific journals, and his work has been widely recognized within the scientific community. He has also been influential in promoting the use of computational modeling and simulation in the study of complex biological phenomena.

== Early life and education ==
James A. Glazier was born in Cambridge,Massachusetts, on June 27, 1962 to Ira A. Glazier (an economist and demographer) and Elaine A. Glazier (a psychologist and later an entrepreneur. He showed an early interest in science and mathematics, which led him to pursue an undergraduate degree in physics and mathematics from Harvard College. He later earned his Ph.D. in experimental condensed matter physics from the University of Chicago in 1989, where he worked under the supervision of Prof. Albert J. Libchaber, focusing on chaotic flows in fluids and the coarsening dynamics of liquid foams. While at the University of Chicago, he began a collaboration with Dr. Gary Grest and Dr. David Srolovitz of Exxon Research applying the Potts Model to model the dynamics of foam coarsening. His work on foams led to extensive collaborations with the noted solid-state theorist Prof. Denis Weaire of Trinity College, Dublin.

== Career ==
Following the completion of his Ph.D., Glazier held postdoctoral positions at AT&T Bell Laboratories (1989-1991) where he retrained in experimental developmental neuroscience under Dr. David W. Tank, and then held an NSF/JSPS fellowship (1991-1993) in the Research Institute of Electrical Communication, Tohoku University, Sendai, Japan, where he studied hydra regeneration and, in collaboration with Dr. Francois Graner, developed the Cellular Potts Model (CPM, also known as the Glazier-Graner-Hogeweg model, GGH) formalism for simulating the dynamics of cells in biological tissues. In 1993, he accepted a faculty position in Physics at the University of Notre Dame. He moved to the Department of Physics at Indiana University in 2002, where he established the Biocomplexity Institute to advance interdisciplinary study of biological systems. He has held visiting faculty positions at the University of Western Australia, the University of Grenoble, Tohoku University, the University of California Los Angeles, and the University of California Santa Barbara,

Glazier's research interests lie at the intersection of physics, biology, and computer science, with a focus on understanding the fundamental principles governing the organization and dynamics of living systems. His most notable contributions have been in the area of multiscale modeling of tissues (Virtual Tissues) where he has developed models that have provided insights into a range of biological phenomena, such as morphogenesis, tissue development, vascular development, developmental diseases, including cancer and polycystic kidney disease and toxicology. He has also conducted research on the physics of liquid foams, high-Reynolds number turbulence, on biological ontologies and in microfluidics and biosensors.

Glazier is one of the key developers of CompuCell3D, an open-source software platform for modeling cell behavior in a 3D environment based on the CPM/GGH methodology. CompuCell3D is designed to simulate cell-based biological processes, such as tissue development, morphogenesis, and cellular differentiation. As a professor and researcher, Dr. Glazier has played a significant role in the development and application of CompuCell3D for various biological systems. More recently, with Dr. Enrdre Somogyi and Dr. TJ Sego, he has contributed to the development of the open-source Tissue Forge virtual-tissue simulation environment based on center-model methodologies. His work has contributed to the advancement of computational modeling and simulation techniques in the fields of biophysics, bioengineering, toxicology, and complex systems.

In addition to his research, Glazier has been an active participant in the scientific community. He has served on the editorial boards of Nonlinearity and Bulletin of Mathematical Biology, as well as on numerous grant review panels and advisory committees. He has also been involved in the organization of conferences and workshops aimed at fostering interdisciplinary collaboration among researchers studying complex biological systems and has organized more than 18 summer schools teaching multiscale modeling techniques to a diverse range of students from around the world. He has served as Chair of the Division of Biological Physics of the American Physical Society. In 2020, he co-founded the IMAG/MSM Working Group on Multiscale Modeling and Viral Pandemics, which provides a forum for the application of modeling methodologies to the understanding of infection and immune response. In 2023, with Prof. Tomas Helikar of the University of Nebraska–Lincoln, he co-founded the Global Alliance for Immune Prediction and Intervention, which aims to develop medical Digital Twins to optimize patient-specific medical care.

== Awards and honors ==
Throughout his career, James A. Glazier has received numerous accolades for his research achievements, being named a fellow of the Institute of Physics (London), the American Physical Society, and the American Association for the Advancement of Science. In 2025, he was the inaugural recipient of the Klaus Schulten and Zaida Luthey-Schulten Computational Biophysics Lecture Award of the Biophysical Society. His work has been cited extensively in the scientific literature and has inspired many researchers in the fields of biophysics and computational biology. He holds 13 patents in biosensors, microfluidics, drug discovery, and computational modeling.

== Selected publications ==
- "Evidence against 'Ultrahard' Thermal Turbulence at Very High Rayleigh Numbers," James A. Glazier, Takehiko Segawa, Antoine Naert and Masaki Sano, Nature 398, 307-310, doi:10.1038/18626 (1999).
- "Contact-Inhibited Chemotaxis in De Novo and Sprouting Blood-Vessel Growth," Roeland M. H. Merks, Erica D. Perryn, Abbas Shirinifard, James A. Glazier, PLoS Computational Biology 4, e1000163, doi: 10.1371/journal.pcbi.1000163 (2008).
- "A Multi-cell, Multi-scale Model of Vertebrate Segmentation and Somite Formation," Susan D. Hester, Julio M. Belmonte, J. Scott Gens, Sherry G. Clendenon, James A. Glazier, PLoS Computational Biology 7, e1002155, doi: 10.1371/journal.pcbi.1002155 (2011).
- "Multi-Scale Modeling of Tissues Using CompuCell3D." Maciej H. Swat, Gilberto L. Thomas, Julio M. Belmonte, Abbas Shirinifard, Dimitrij Hmeljak, James A. Glazier, in Computational Methods in Cell Biology, Anand R Asthagiri Adam P Arkin, editors (Methods in Cell Biology 110, Academic Press, USA, 2012), p. 325-366, doi: 10.1016/B978-0-12-388403-9.00013-8.
- "Somites Without a Clock," Ana S. Dias, Irene de Almeida, Julio M. Belmonte, James A. Glazier, Claudio D. Stern, Science 343, 791-795, doi: 10.1126/science.1247575 (2014).
- "A modular framework for multiscale, multicellular, spatiotemporal modeling of acute primary viral infection and immune response in epithelial tissues and its application to drug therapy timing and effectiveness," T. J. Sego, Josua O. Aponte-Serrano, Juliano Ferrari-Gianlupi, Samuel R. Heaps, Kira Breithaupt, Lutz Brusch, Jessica Crawshaw, James M. Osborne, Ellen M. Quardokus, Richard K. Plemper, James A. Glazier, PLoS Computational Biology 16: e1008451. doi:10.1371/journal.pcbi.1008451 (2020).
