= Arpita Upadhyaya =

Indian-American biophysicist

Arpita Upadhyaya is an Indian and American biophysicist whose research concerns the mechanical behavior of cells and the effects of mechanical forces and actions on cellular signaling, especially in organism development, immune response, and cancer. She is a professor of physics at the University of Maryland, College Park.

== Education and career ==
Upadhyaya did her undergraduate studies at BITS Pilani in India, and received a Ph.D. in physics from the University of Notre Dame in the United States, working there with James A. Glazier.

After postdoctoral research with Alexander van Oudenaarden at the Massachusetts Institute of Technology, and another year at the University of North Carolina at Chapel Hill, she became a faculty member at the University of Maryland in 2006. She was tenured as an associate professor in 2014.

== Recognition ==
Upadhyaya was named a Fellow of the American Physical Society (APS) in 2021, after a nomination from the APS Division of Biological Physics, "for contributions to understanding mechanisms of biological force generation and how these forces enable immune cells to respond to the physical properties of their environment, bearing insights into the complex and biomedically crucial mechanisms of T cell and B cell activation".
