= Multienzyme complex =

Protein complex for carrying out biochemical reactions

In molecular biology, a multienzyme complex is a protein complex containing several copies of one or more enzymes packed into one macromolecular assembly. Multienzyme complexes carry out a single or multi-step biochemical reaction taking place within cells. It allows the cell to segregate certain biochemical pathways into one place in the cell.

Examples include pyruvate dehydrogenase, fatty acid synthetase, glutamine synthetase, proteasome, rubisco.

A multienzyme complex that functions in the histidine biosynthesis pathway has been studied at the biochemical and genetic level in the fungus Neurospora crassa. A gene (His-3) was found to encode a protein that functions as a multienzyme complex having three distinct enzymatic activities in the biosynthesis pathway. A genetic analysis of mutants defective in the N. crassa histidine pathway indicated that the individual activities of the multienzyme complex occur in discrete regions of the His-3 genetic map. This finding suggested that each of the activities of the multienzyme complex are encoded separately from each other, but within the same gene. Some His-3 mutants were also found that lacked all three activities simultaneously, suggesting that some mutations can cause loss of function of the whole multienzyme complex.

== See also ==
- Quaternary structure
- Protein complex
- Macromolecular assembly
- Biomolecular complex
