= Berkeley Madonna =

Mathematical modelling software package

- Original authors: Robert Macey and George Oster
- Stable release: Version 10.2.6 / 2021-02-28
- Written in: C, Java
- Operating system: Windows, MacOS
- Platform: PC, Macintosh
- Type: Mathematical software
- License: Proprietary
- Website: www.berkeleymadonna.com

Berkeley Madonna is a mathematical modelling software package, developed at the University of California at Berkeley by Robert Macey and George Oster. It numerically solves ordinary differential equations and difference equations, originally developed to execute STELLA programs.

Its strength lies in a relatively simple syntax to define differential equations coupled with a simple yet powerful user interface. In particular, Berkeley Madonna provides the facility of putting parameters onto a slider that can in turn be moved by a user to change the value. Such visualizations enable quick assessments of whether or not a particular model class is suitable to describe the data to be analyzed and modeled, and, later, communicating models easily to other disciplines such as medical decision makers.

== Uses ==
It has become a standard in the development and communication of pharmacometric models describing drug concentration and its effects in drug development as well as modeling of physiological processes. A user community exists in the form of a LinkedIn user group with more than 750 members (February 2023).

The use of system dynamics modeling has expanded into other areas such as system physics, epidemiology, environmental health, and population ecology.

== Versions ==
There are three versions of Berkeley Madonna: Education, intended for educational purposes, Academic, for academic, non-profit, and government researchers and Professional, for researchers working in corporate, for-profit settings.
