= Macromolecular assembly =

Large chemical complexes composed of polymers and other macromolecules

Structure of nucleoprotein MA: The 50S ribosomal subunit from H. marismortui X-ray crystallographic model of 29 of the 33 native components, from the laboratory of Thomas Steitz. Of the 31 component proteins, 27 are shown (blue), along with its 2 RNA strands (orange/yellow). Scale: assembly is approx. 24 nm across.

In molecular biology, the term macromolecular assembly (MA) refers to massive chemical structures such as viruses and non-biologic nanoparticles, cellular organelles and membranes and ribosomes, etc. that are complex mixtures of polypeptide, polynucleotide, polysaccharide or other polymeric macromolecules. They are generally of more than one of these types, and the mixtures are defined spatially (i.e., with regard to their chemical shape), and with regard to their underlying chemical composition and structure. Macromolecules are found in living and nonliving things, and are composed of many hundreds or thousands of atoms held together by covalent bonds; they are often characterized by repeating units (i.e., they are polymers). Assemblies of these can likewise be biologic or non-biologic, though the MA term is more commonly applied in biology, and the term supramolecular assembly is more often applied in non-biologic contexts (e.g., in supramolecular chemistry and nanotechnology). MAs of macromolecules are held in their defined forms by non-covalent intermolecular interactions (rather than covalent bonds), and can be in either non-repeating structures (e.g., as in the ribosome (image) and cell membrane architectures), or in repeating linear, circular, spiral, or other patterns (e.g., as in actin filaments and the flagellar motor, image). The process by which MAs are formed has been termed molecular self-assembly, a term especially applied in non-biologic contexts. A wide variety of physical/biophysical, chemical/biochemical, and computational methods exist for the study of MA; given the scale (molecular dimensions) of MAs, efforts to elaborate their composition and structure and discern mechanisms underlying their functions are at the forefront of modern structure science.

== Biomolecular complex ==
A eukaryotic ribosome, which catalytically translate the information content contained in mRNA molecules into proteins. The animation presents the elongation and membrane targeting stages of eukaryotic translation, showing the mRNA as a black arc, the ribosome subunits in green and yellow, tRNAs in dark blue, proteins such as elongation and other factors involved in light blue, the growing polypeptide chain as a black thread growing vertically from the curve of the mRNA. At end of the animation, the polypeptide produced is extruded through a light blue SecY pore into the gray interior of the ER.

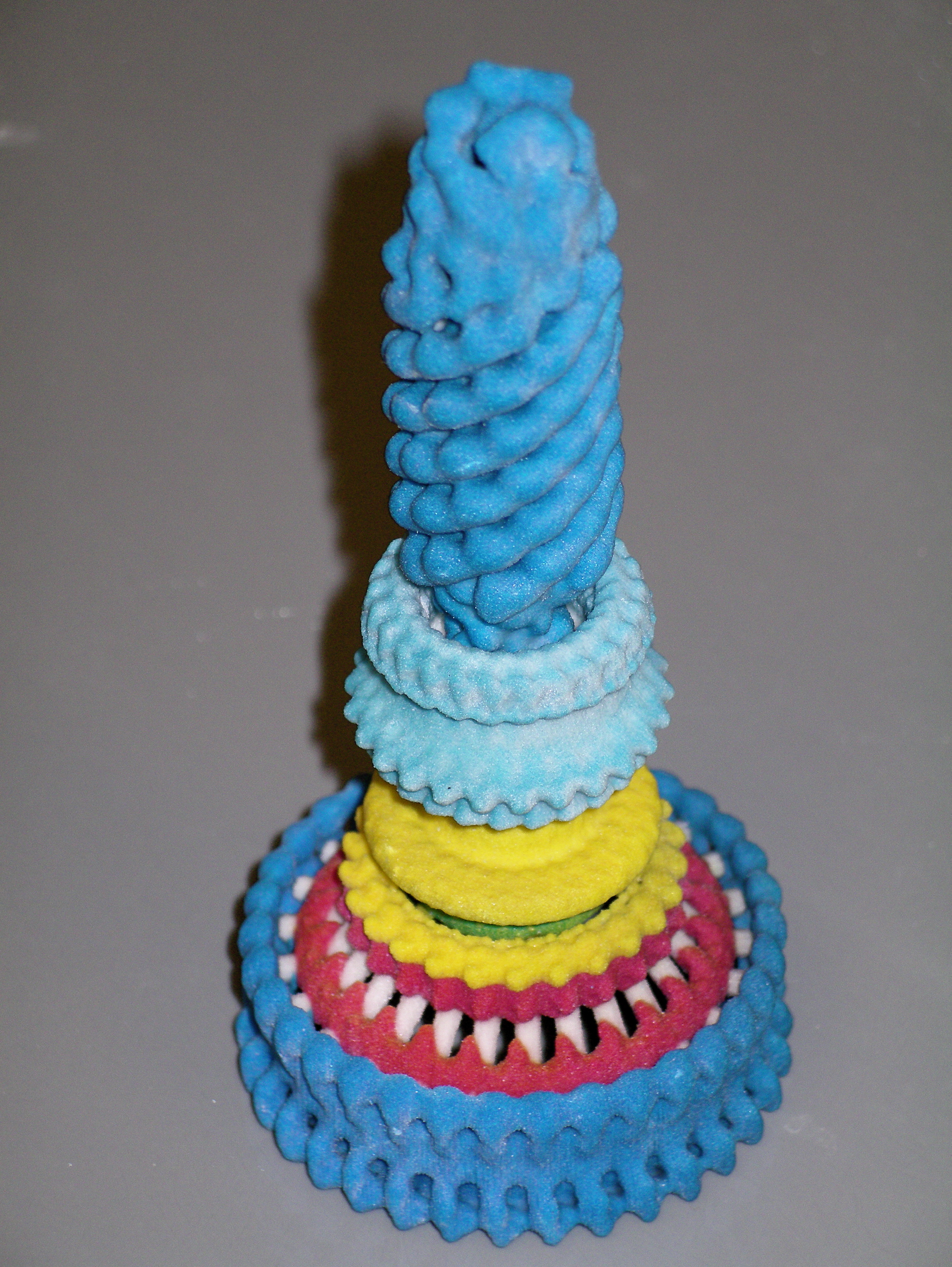
3D printed model of the structure of a bacterial flagellum "motor" and partial rod structure of a Salmonella species. Bottom to top: dark blue, repeating FliM and FliN, motor/switch proteins; red, FliG motor/switch proteins; yellow, FliF transmembrane coupling proteins; light blue, L and P ring proteins; and (at top), dark blue, the cap, hook-filament junction, hook, and rod proteins.

A biomolecular complex, also called a biomacromolecular complex, is any biological complex made of more than one biopolymer (protein, RNA, DNA, carbohydrate) or large non-polymeric biomolecules (lipid). The interactions between these biomolecules are non-covalent. Examples:

- Protein complexes, some of which are multienzyme complexes: proteasome, DNA polymerase III holoenzyme, RNA polymerase II holoenzyme, symmetric viral capsids, chaperonin complex GroEL-GroES, photosystem I, ATP synthase, ferritin.
- RNA-protein complexes: ribosome, spliceosome, vault, SnRNP. Such complexes in cell nucleus are called ribonucleoproteins (RNPs).
- DNA-protein complexes: nucleosome.
- Protein-lipid complexes: lipoprotein.

The biomacromolecular complexes are studied structurally by X-ray crystallography, NMR spectroscopy of proteins, cryo-electron microscopy and successive single particle analysis, and electron tomography. The atomic structure models obtained by X-ray crystallography and biomolecular NMR spectroscopy can be docked into the much larger structures of biomolecular complexes obtained by lower resolution techniques like electron microscopy, electron tomography, and small-angle X-ray scattering.

Complexes of macromolecules occur ubiquitously in nature, where they are involved in the construction of viruses and all living cells. In addition, they play fundamental roles in all basic life processes (protein translation, cell division, vesicle trafficking, intra- and inter-cellular exchange of material between compartments, etc.). In each of these roles, complex mixtures of become organized in specific structural and spatial ways. While the individual macromolecules are held together by a combination of covalent bonds and intramolecular non-covalent forces (i.e., associations between parts within each molecule, via charge-charge interactions, van der Waals forces, and dipole–dipole interactions such as hydrogen bonds), by definition MAs themselves are held together solely via the noncovalent forces, except now exerted between molecules (i.e., intermolecular interactions).

== MA scales and examples ==
The images above give an indication of the compositions and scale (dimensions) associated with MAs, though these just begin to touch on the complexity of the structures; in principle, each living cell is composed of MAs, but is itself an MA as well. In the examples and other such complexes and assemblies, MAs are each often millions of daltons in molecular weight (megadaltons, i.e., millions of times the weight of a single, simple atom), though still having measurable component ratios (stoichiometries) at some level of precision. As alluded to in the image legends, when properly prepared, MAs or component subcomplexes of MAs can often be crystallized for study by protein crystallography and related methods, or studied by other physical methods (e.g., spectroscopy, microscopy).

Cross-sections of phospholipid (PLs) relevant to biomembrane MAs. Yellow-orange indicates hydrophobic lipid tails; black and white spheres represent PL polar regions (v.i.). Bilayer/liposome dimensions (obscured in graphic): hydrophobic and polar regions, each ~30 Å (3.0 nm) "thick"—the polar from ~15 Å (1.5 nm) on each side.

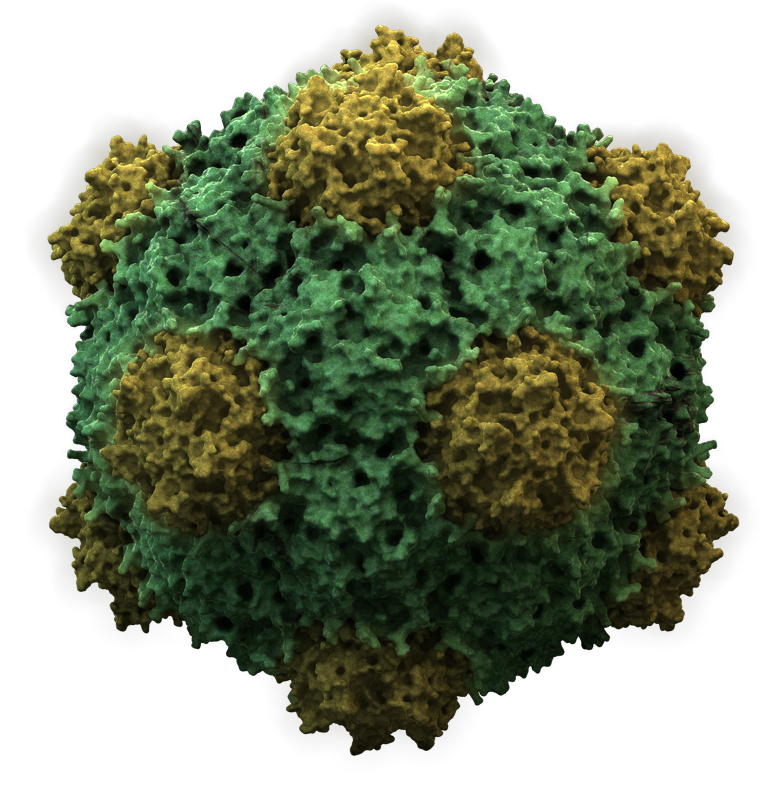
A graphical representation of the structure of a viral MA, cowpea mosaic virus, with 30 copies of each of its coat proteins, the small coat protein (S, yellow) and the large coat protein (L, green), which, along with 2 molecules of positive-sense RNA (RNA-1 and RNA-2, not visible) constitute the virion. The assembly is highly symmetric, and is ~280 Å (28 nm) across at its widest point.

Virus structures were among the first studied MAs; other biologic examples include ribosomes (partial image above), proteasomes, and translation complexes (with protein and nucleic acid components), procaryotic and eukaryotic transcription complexes, and nuclear and other biological pores that allow material passage between cells and cellular compartments. Biomembranes are also generally considered MAs, though the requirement for structural and spatial definition is modified to accommodate the inherent molecular dynamics of membrane lipids, and of proteins within lipid bilayers.

=== Virus assembly ===
During assembly of the bacteriophage (phage) T4 virion, the morphogenetic proteins encoded by the phage genes interact with each other in a characteristic sequence. Maintaining an appropriate balance in the amounts of each of these proteins produced during viral infection appears to be critical for normal phage T4 morphogenesis. Phage T4 encoded proteins that determine virion structure include major structural components, minor structural components and non-structural proteins that catalyze specific steps in the morphogenesis sequence

== Non-biologic counterparts ==
Finally, biology is not the sole domain of MAs. The fields of supramolecular chemistry and nanotechnology each have areas that have developed to elaborate and extend the principles first demonstrated in biologic MAs. Of particular interest in these areas has been elaborating the fundamental processes of molecular machines, and extending known machine designs to new types and processes.

== See also ==
- Multi-state modeling of biomolecules
- Quaternary structure
- Multiprotein complex
- Organelle: the broadest definition of "organelle" includes not only membrane bound cellular structures, but also very large biomolecular complexes.
- Multi-state modeling of biomolecules
