= Biocomplexity Institute of Virginia Tech =

Research organization for computational biology and related fields

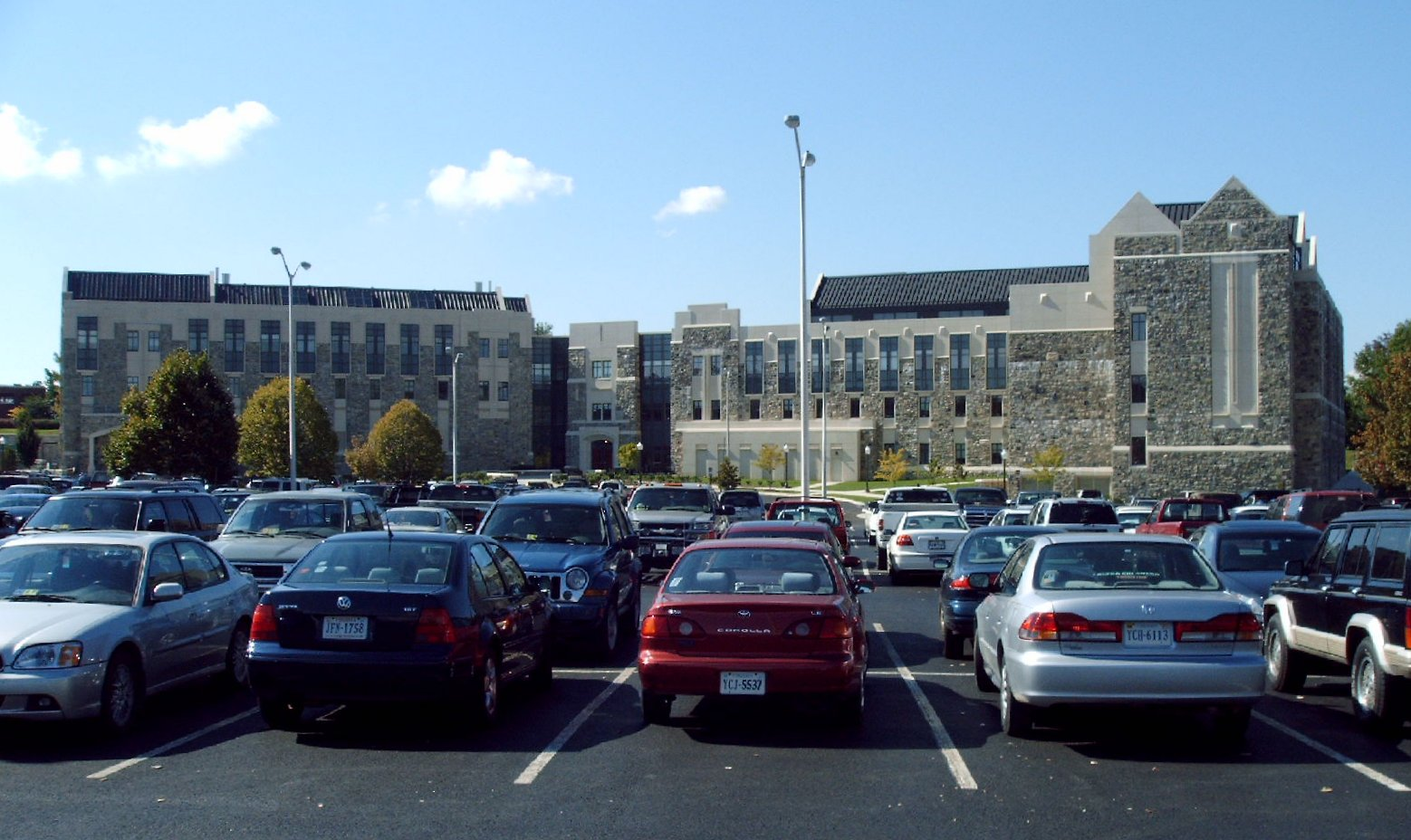
- Motto: Ut Prosim (Latin)
- Motto in English: That I May Serve
- Established: 2000
- Affiliations: Virginia Tech
- Executive Director: Chris Barrett
- Location: Blacksburg, Arlington, in Virginia, United States
- Yearly Research Portfolio: $68 Million
- Website: bi.vt.edu

The Biocomplexity Institute of Virginia Tech (formerly the Virginia Bioinformatics Institute) was a research institute specializing in bioinformatics, computational biology, and systems biology. The institute had more than 250 personnel, including over 50 tenured and research faculty. Research at the institute involved collaboration in disciplines such as mathematics, computer science and biology. The institute developed -omic and bioinformatic tools and databases that can be applied to the study of human, animal and plant diseases as well as the discovery of new vaccine, drug and diagnostic targets.

The institute's programs were supported by a variety of government and private agencies including the National Institutes of Health, National Science Foundation, U.S. Department of Defense, U.S. Department of Agriculture, and U.S. Department of Energy. Since inception, the Biocomplexity Institute has received over $179 million in extramural support. It has a research portfolio totaling $68 million in grants and contracts. The institute's executive director was Chris Barrett.

In 2019, the institute was absorbed into the Fralin Institute of Life Sciences at Virginia Tech after many faculty members, including Barrett, were hired away to form the Biocomplexity Institute and Initiative of the University of Virginia.

== History ==
The institute opened in July 2000 in space in the Virginia Tech Corporate Research Center; it was hosted briefly in Building XI, then Building X, until it moved to Building XV in 2002, which was designed to host the institute. In January 2005, it moved into a new building on the main Virginia Tech's campus, called "Bioinformatics Facility Phase I and II", but retained its existing space in the CRC. In 2011, the institute moved its National Capital Region office into the Virginia Tech building in Arlington, Virginia. In 2015, the Virginia Bioinformatics Institute was quietly renamed and rebranded as the "Biocomplexity Institute". In November 2016, the home of the institute on Virginia Tech's main campus was dedicated as Steger Hall, after former Virginia Tech president Charles Steger.

== Major research divisions ==
The Advanced Computing and Informatics Laboratories is dedicated to "Policy Informatics", including the Network Dynamics and Simulation Science Laboratory. It pursues research and development in interaction-based modeling, simulation, and associated analysis, experimental design, and decision support tools for understanding large biological, information, social, and technological systems. It includes the Comprehensive National Incident Management System project for developing a system to provide the United States military with detailed operational information about the populations being affected by a possible crisis. It also includes the project, “Modeling Disease Dynamics on Large, Detailed, Co-Evolving Networks,” which supports work to develop high-performance computer models for the study of very large networks.

The Cyberinfrastructure Division develops methods, infrastructure, and resources primarily for infectious disease research. The “Pathosystems Resource Integration Center - Bioinformatics Resource Center for Bacterial Diseases” aims to integrate information on pathogens, provide resources and tools to analyze genomic, proteomic and other data arising from infectious disease research. It is part of the Middle-Atlantic Regional Center of Excellence for Biodefense and Emerging Infectious Diseases Research), which focuses on research to enable rapid defense against bioterror and emerging infectious diseases. Specific diseases and disease-causing agents under investigation include anthrax, West Nile virus, smallpox, and cryptosporidiosis The division collaborates with Georgetown University and Social and Scientific Systems on the Administrative Center of the National Institute of Allergy and Infectious Diseases-funded Proteomics Research Resource Center (PRC) for Biodefense Proteomics Research project. The team helps design, develop, and maintain a publicly accessible Web site containing data and technology protocols generated by each PRC, as well as a catalog that lists reagents and products available for public distribution.

The Biological Systems Division develops computational methods for studying biochemical networks using experimental data . It developed COPASI (Complex Pathway Simulator), an open-source software package that allows users with limited experience in mathematics to construct models and simulations of biochemical networks. It also developed GenoCAD, a web-based Computer Assisted Design environment for synthetic biology.

The Medical Informatics & Systems Division focuses on human genetics and disease, especially cancer and neurological disorders. It collaborates with Carilion Clinics, Virginia Tech Carilion School of Medicine and Research Institute, and other universities and government agencies.

== Major research laboratories ==
The Network Dynamics and Simulation Science Laboratory at ACDIL pursues programs for interaction-based modeling, simulation, and associated analysis, experimental design, and decision support tools for understanding large and complex systems. Extremely detailed, high-resolution, multi-scale computer simulations allow formal and experimental investigation of these systems.

Social and Decision Analytics Laboratory focuses on the use and development of analytical technology in the areas of public health policy, national and international security policy & public and social policy.

The Nutritional Immunology and Molecular Medicine Laboratory was founded in 2002 to investigate fundamental mechanisms of gut enteric immunity, and identifying biomarkers and therapeutic targets for inflammatory and immune-mediated diseases. The center has discovered the mechanism of action underlying the anti-inflammatory actions of Conjugated linoleic acid in inflammatory bowel disease, and the insulin sensitizing and anti-inflammatory effects of abscisic acid. Its Center for Modeling Immunity to Enteric Pathogens Program is applying high performance computing techniques to model and simulate human immunology systems and help immunologists conduct quick in silico experiments to narrow down experimental design, validate their hypotheses and save significant time and laboratory cost. This laboratory is also collaborating with the Center for Global Health at the University of Virginia, the Department of Gastroenterology and the University of North Carolina at Chapel Hill and other medical schools and leading several human clinical trials on safer therapies for inflammatory and immune mediated diseases. It has recently established a partnership with the Division of Gastroenterology at the Carilion Clinic to launch a joint translational research program in inflammatory bowel diseases.

== Core facilities and services ==
The institute occupies more than 130,000 square feet (12,000 m^{2}) on the Virginia Tech campus, including over 40,000 square feet (3,700 m^{2}) of laboratory space, designed for flexibility and to house computing and laboratory facilities. The institute occupies 5,000 square feet (460 m^{2}) in Alexandria, Virginia, as part of Virginia Tech National Capital Region. The institute's infrastructure includes core facilities that integrate high-throughput data generation and data analysis capabilities.

The Core Computational Facility has three data centers occupying over 3,700 square feet (340 m^{2}), with over 250 servers totalling over 10.5 terabytes of random access memory, distributed over more than 2650 processor cores. It has a storage area network with over 1 petabyte of disk and 3 petabytes of tape, expandable to 50 petabytes.

The Genomics Research Laboratory has 6,500 square feet (600 m^{2}) of laboratory space located at the institute's main building. It possesses state-of-the-art Roche GS-FLX, Illumina and Ion Torrent genome sequencers. It includes the Affymetrix National Custom Array Center for custom microarray design, sample processing and analytical services

The Data Analysis Core offers Turnkey service to analyze -omics and other data from raw data in to manuscript ready figures and text out. It also provides Nexgen sequence assembly and annotation; microarray design, analysis and interpretation; mass spec data analysis; data QC; hypothesis generation; experimental design; statistical data analysis

== Education and outreach ==
K–12 programs include "Kids' Tech University," (an educational research program for sparking interest in science, technology, engineering, and mathematics disciplines), the Climate Change Student Summit for teachers and students, and high school summer internships.

Undergraduate Programs include Research Experiences for Undergraduates in microbiology and in systems biology, and a Summer Research Institute for foreign and local students.

The institute is the home of the Genomics, Bioinformatics, Computational Biology Graduate Program at Virginia Tech, and accommodates students in various Virginia Tech departments.
