= Paulien Hogeweg =

Dutch biophysicist

- Born: 24 December 1943 (age 82); Amsterdam
- Education: Universiteit van Amsterdam Utrecht University
- Known for: coined the term Bioinformatics in 1970, Cellular Potts model
- Scientific career
- Fields: theoretical biologist, bioinformatics, prebiotic evolution, in silico evolution
- Workplaces: Utrecht University
- Website: https://tbb.bio.uu.nl/ph/

Paulien Hogeweg (born 1943) is a Dutch theoretical biologist and complex systems researcher studying biological systems as dynamic information processing systems at many interconnected levels. In 1970, together with Ben Hesper, she defined the term bioinformatics as "the study of informatic processes in biotic systems".

== Early life and education ==
Born in Amsterdam, the Netherlands, Hogeweg graduated with a master's degree from the University of Amsterdam in 1969. In her last year as Biology Masters Student, Hogeweg published her studies on water plants titled Structure of aquatic vegetation: a comparison of aquatic vegetation in India, the Netherlands and Czechoslovakia. While volunteering at Leiden University, Hogeweg started her study as a Ph.D. student at Utrecht University. She published seven articles based on her Ph.D. work. She graduated from Utrecht University in 1976. The title of her thesis is "Topics in Biological Pattern Analysis", which addressed pattern formation and pattern recognition in biology.

== Career ==
After graduating with a Masters in biology she went to volunteer at a Lab at Leiden University. It was when volunteering at Leiden University that she met Hesper and coined the term Bioinformatics, which she defines as:"the study of information processes in biotic systems." In 1977, Hogeweg opened a research lab dedicated to bioinformatics with Ben Hesper. In 1990, Hogeweg published an important paper in the field of pre-biotic study: Spiral wave structure in pre-biotic evolution hypercycle stable against parasites. In 1991, Hogeweg became a full professor of Theoretical Biology at Utrecht University (UU). Since 2008, Hogeweg has been an Honorary professor at UU. Hogeweg has participated as an editor board member for Journal Theoretical Biology, Bulletin Mathematical Biology, Biosystems, Artificial Life Journal, and Ecological Informatics. In 2025, Hogeweg has been elected as EMBO member in recognition of her outstanding scientific achievements as a pioneer in bioinformatics and theoretical biology.

== Research ==
Starting with asynchronous extensions of L-systems she pioneered agent-based modeling studying development of social structure in animal societies, using the opportunity based "ToDo" principle where agents "do what there is to do", and a "DoDom" principle for dominance ranking, also known as the winner-loser effect. This type of research later became popular in artificial life.

When the first biological sequence data became available (from the EMBL) she developed a tree based algorithm for multiple sequence alignment. which is now common practice in sequence alignment and phylogeny. At about the same time she pioneered folding algorithms for predicting RNA secondary structures. RNA folding was also introduced to allow for a non-linear genotype to phenotype mapping to study evolution on complex fitness landscapes .

The first phase-phase trajectory of a chaotic attractor in an ecological food-chain model of three differential equations appeared long before chaos became popular. She pioneered the use of cellular automata for studying spatial ecological and evolutionary processes and demonstrated that spatial pattern formation can revert evolutionary selection pressures.

Extending the Cellular Potts model (CPM) to study morphogenesis and development she modeled the complete life cycle of Dictyostelium discoideum using simple rules for chemotaxis and differential adhesion . This CPM approach is now used for modeling in various areas of developmental biology, and the migration of immune cells in lymphoid tissues. Finally the CPM is used for EvoDevo research.

In recent years, Hogeweg has continued her research on co-evolutionary dynamics and morphogenesis, to expand on "adaptive genomics" and to study the interface between gene regulation and evolution in cellular organisms. Also, her research is focused on evolvability at the level of genome organization and regulatory networks, and has shown RNA increase in complexity as the result of interactions of secondary structure and spatial pattern formation.

== Collaborations ==
Hogeweg has participated in diverse research groups in biological science. Her contribution varies from developing computational methods such as algorithm for tree based multiple sequence alignment which has become a standard practice. Most importantly, her work has greatly contributed to bioinformatics theory.
