= Cellular Potts model =

Computational model of cells and tissues

In computational biology, a Cellular Potts model (CPM, also known as the Glazier-Graner-Hogeweg model) is a computational model of cells and tissues. It is used to simulate individual and collective cell behavior, tissue morphogenesis and cancer development. CPM describes cells as deformable objects with a certain volume, that can adhere to each other and to the medium in which they live. The formalism can be extended to include cell behaviours such as cell migration, growth and division, and cell signalling. The first CPM was proposed for the simulation of cell sorting by François Graner and James A. Glazier as a modification of a large-Q Potts model. CPM was then popularized by Paulien Hogeweg for studying morphogenesis. Although the model was developed to describe biological cells, it can also be used to model individual parts of a biological cell, or even regions of fluid.

== Model description ==
Cartoon example of lattice used in Cellular Potts Model.

The CPM consists of a rectangular Euclidean lattice, where each cell is a subset of lattice sites sharing the same cell ID (analogous to spin in Potts models in physics). Lattice sites that are not occupied by cells are the medium. The dynamics of the model are governed by an energy function: the Hamiltonian which describes the energy of a particular configuration of cells in the lattice. In a basic CPM, this energy results from adhesion between cells and resistance of cells to volume changes. The algorithm for updating CPM minimizes this energy.

In order to evolve the model Metropolis-style updates are performed, that is:

1. choose a random lattice site i
2. choose a random neighboring lattice site j to copy its ID into i.
3. calculate the difference in energy ($\Delta H$) between the original and the proposed new configuration.
4. accept or reject this copy event based on the change in energy $\Delta H$, as follows:
  if the new energy is lower, always accept the copy;
  if the new energy is higher, accept the copy with probability $e^{-\Delta H / T}$ (the Boltzmann temperature T determines the likelihood of energetically unfavorable fluctuations).

=== The Hamiltonian ===
The original model proposed by Graner and Glazier contains cells of two types, with different adhesion energies for cells of the same type and cells of a different type. Each cell type also has a different contact energy with the medium, and the cell volume is assumed to remain close to a target value. The Hamiltonian is formulated as:

$$\begin{align}
H = \sum_{i,j\text{ neighbors}}J\left(\tau(\sigma_i),\tau(\sigma_j)\right)\left(1-\delta(\sigma_i,\sigma_j)\right)
+ \lambda\sum_{\sigma_i}\left(v(\sigma_i)- V(\sigma_i)\right)^2,\\
\end{align}$$

where i, j are lattice sites, σ_{i} is the cell at site i, τ(σ) is the cell type of cell σ, J is the coefficient determining the adhesion between two cells of types τ(σ),τ(σ'), δ is the Kronecker delta, v(σ) is the volume of cell σ, V(σ) is the target volume, and λ is a Lagrange multiplier determining the strength of the volume constraint.

Cells with a lower J value for their membrane contact will stick together more strongly. Therefore, different patterns of cell sorting can be simulated by varying the J values.

== Extensions ==
Over time, the CPM has evolved from a specific model of cell sorting to a general framework with many extensions, some of which are partially or entirely off-lattice. Various cell behaviours, such as chemotaxis, elongation and haptotaxis can be incorporated by extending either the Hamiltonian, H, or the change in energy $\Delta H$. Auxiliary sub-lattices may be used to include additional spatial information, such as the concentrations of chemicals.

=== Chemotaxis ===
In CPM, cells can be made to move in the direction of higher chemokine concentration, by increasing the probability of copying the ID of site j into site i when the chemokine concentration is higher at j. This is done by modifying the change in energy $\Delta H$ with a term that is proportional to the difference in concentration at i and j:

$$\begin{align}
\Delta H'=\Delta H-\mu(C_i-C_j)\\
\end{align}$$

Where $\mu$ is the strength of chemotactic movement, and $C_i$ and $C_j$ are the concentration of the chemokine at site i and j, respectively. The chemokine gradient is typically implemented on a separate lattice of the same dimensions as the cell lattice.

=== Multiscale and hybrid modeling using CPM ===
Core GGH (or CPM) algorithm which defines the evolution of the cellular level structures can easily be integrated with intracellular signaling dynamics, reaction diffusion dynamics and rule based model to account for the processes which happen at lower (or higher) time scale. Open source software Bionetsolver can be used to integrate intracellular dynamics with CPM algorithm.

=== Applications of Cellular-Potts Model ===
The Cellular Potts Model (CPM)—also known as the Glazier-Graner-Hogeweg (GGH) model—is widely used in computational biology to simulate multicellular systems. It allows modeling of cell shape, movement, adhesion, growth, and interactions with the environment, making it highly suitable for studying tissue morphogenesis, cancer, cell sorting, and pattern formation. Below is a table summarizing key biological applications of CPM along with representative references.

Biological Applications of the Cellular Potts Model (CPM)
Application	Description	Key Reference
Cell Sorting	Simulates differential adhesion and spontaneous segregation of mixed cell populations.	Graner F, Glazier JA (1992). "Simulation of biological cell sorting using a two-dimensional extended Potts model". Physical Review Letters. 69 (13): 2013–2016. doi:10.1103/PhysRevLett.69.2013
Tissue Morphogenesis	Models shaping of tissues during development (e.g., elongation, invagination).	Zajac M, Jones GL, Glazier JA (2000). "Model of convergent extension in animal morphogenesis". Physical Review Letters. 85 (9): 2022–2025. doi:10.1103/PhysRevLett.85.2022
Tumor Growth and Invasion	Simulates cancer growth, invasion, and microenvironment interactions.	Szabó A, Merks RMH (2013). "Cellular Potts modeling of tumor growth, tumor invasion, and tumor evolution". Frontiers in Oncology. 3: 87. doi:10.3389/fonc.2013.00087
Collective Cell Migration	Models coordinated movement of cell groups (e.g., wound healing, embryogenesis).	Coburn L, Cerone L, Torney C, Couzin ID, Neufeld Z (2013). "Tactile interactions lead to coherent motion and enhanced chemotaxis of migrating cells". Physical Biology. 10 (4): 046002. doi:10.1088/1478-3975/10/4/046002
Pattern Formation	Simulates spatial patterning via cell signaling and adhesion dynamics.	Merks RMH, Glazier JA (2005). "A cell-centered approach to developmental biology". Physical Biology. 2 (2): 60–70. doi:10.1088/1478-3975/2/2/001
Angiogenesis	Simulates blood vessel formation in response to VEGF and ECM cues.	Merks RMH, Brodsky SV, Goligorsky MS, Newman SA, Glazier JA (2006). "Cell elongation is key to in silico replication of in vitro vasculogenesis and subsequent remodeling". Developmental Biology. 289 (1): 44–54. doi:10.1016/j.ydbio.2005.10.003
Stem Cell Dynamics	Models proliferation and differentiation within structured tissue niches.	Buske P, Galle J, Barker N, Aust G, Clevers H, Loeffler M (2011). "A comprehensive model of the spatio-temporal stem cell and tissue organisation in the intestinal crypt". PLoS Computational Biology. 7 (1): e1001045. doi:10.1371/journal.pcbi.1001045
Cell Competition	Simulates homeostasis and elimination of less-fit cells by neighbors.	Wagstaff L, Kolahgar G, Piddini E (2013). "Competitive cell interactions in cancer: A cellular tug of war". Trends in Cell Biology. 23 (4): 160–167.
Drug and Therapy Modeling	Used to evaluate therapeutic effects on multicellular systems.	Rejniak KA, Anderson ARA (2011). "Hybrid models of tumor growth". Wiley Interdisciplinary Reviews: Systems Biology and Medicine. 3 (1): 115–125. doi:10.1002/wsbm.102

=== Frameworks Implementing the Cellular Potts Model ===
The following frameworks allow users to apply the CPM to multicellular model construction.

Comparison of Cellular Potts Model (CPM) Frameworks
Framework	Programming Language(s)	Platform	GUI	Key Features
CompuCell3D	Python, C++	Windows, macOS, Linux	Yes	Full CPM support, reaction-diffusion, plugin system, tissue modeling
Morpheus	XML, C++	Cross-platform	Yes	CPM + ODE/PDE integration, multiscale modeling, user-friendly GUI
Tissue Simulation Toolkit (TST)	C++	Linux/Unix, macOS	No	2D CPM, cell movement and adhesion modeling
CHASTE	C++	Linux, macOS	Partial (via scripts/visualization)	General biological simulations, CPM, cardiac modeling
Artistoo	JavaScript	Web browser	Yes (interactive in-browser)	Browser-based CPM, real-time visualization, easy sharing
