= COPASI =

Mathematical biology software

- Initial release: October 11, 2004; 20 years ago
- Stable release: 4.40 (Build 278) / May 31, 2023; 2 years ago
- Repository: github.com/copasi/COPASI
- Written in: C++
- Operating system: Linux, macOS and Microsoft Windows
- Platform: Qt
- License: Artistic License
- Website: copasi.org

COPASI (COmplex PAthway SImulator) is an open-source software application for creating and solving mathematical models of biological processes such as metabolic networks, cell-signaling pathways, regulatory networks, infectious diseases, and many others.

== History ==
COPASI is based on the Gepasi simulation software that was developed in the early 1990s by Pedro Mendes. The initial development of COPASI was funded by the Virginia Bioinformatics Institute, and the Klaus Tschira Foundation. Current development efforts are supported by grants from the National Institutes of Health, the BBSRC, and the German Ministry of Education.

== Development team ==
COPASI is the result of an international collaboration between the University of Manchester (UK), the University of Heidelberg (Germany), and the Virginia Bioinformatics Institute (USA). The project principal investigators are Pedro Mendes and Ursula Kummer. The chief software architects are Stefan Hoops and Sven Sahle.

== Features ==
COPASI includes features to define models of biological processes, simulate and analyze these models, generate analysis reports, and import/export models in SBML format.

- Model definition: Models are defined as chemical reactions between molecular species. The dynamics of the model is determined by Rate law associated with individual reactions. Models can also include compartments, events, and other global variables that can help specify the dynamics of the system.
- Tasks: Tasks are different types of analysis that can be performed on a model. They include steady-state analysis, stoichiometric analysis, time course simulation using deterministic and stochastic simulation algorithms, metabolic control analysis, computation of Lyapunov exponent, time scale separation, parameter scans, optimization, and parameter estimation.
- Importing and Exporting: COPASI can read models in SBML format as well as in Gepasi format. COPASI can write models in several different formats including the SBML, source code in the C programming language, Berkeley Madonna files, and XPPAUT files.

== See also ==
- List of systems biology modeling software
