= Global Biodata Coalition =

The Global Biodata Coalition is an organization promoting biocuration and fostering support of research funders for the sustainability of biological data resources.

== Global Core Biodata Resources (GCBRs) ==
The organization maintains a list of resources, representing "critical components for ensuring the reproducibility and integrity of life sciences research."

As of 2023, the list includes the following organizations:

- Alliance of Genome Resources
- BacDive
- BAR: Bio-Analytic Resource for Plant Biology
- Bgee
- BRENDA
- Catalogue of Life (COL)
- CATH database
- Cellosaurus
- ChEBI
- ChEMBL
- CIViC: Clinical Interpretation of Variants in Cancer
- Clinical Genome Resource (ClinGen)
- DNA Data Bank of Japan (DDBJ Center)
- EcoCyc
- Ensembl
- Europe PMC
- European Nucleotide Archive (ENA)
- FlyBase
- GENCODE
- Gene Ontology (GO)
- Global Biodiversity Information Facility (GBIF)
- Genome Aggregation Database (gnomAD)
- Genome Sequence Archive (GSA)
- NHGRI-EBI Catalog of human genome-wide association studies (GWAS Catalog)
- Gene Expression Database (GXD)
- HGNC: HUGO Gene Nomenclature Committee
- Human Disease Ontology Knowledgebase (DO-KB)
- Human Protein Atlas
- IMEx: International Molecular Exchange Consortium
- InterPro
- IUPHAR/BPS Guide to PHARMACOLOGY
- LIPID MAPS
- LPSN: List of Prokaryotic names with Standing in Nomenclature
- MGD: Mouse Genome Database
- Orphadata Science
- PANTHER
- PharmGKB: Pharmacogenomics Knowledgebase
- Planteome (including the Plant Ontology)
- PomBase
- Protein Data Bank (PDB)
- ProteomeXchange Consortium
- Rat Genome Database (RGD)
- Reactome
- Rhea
- Saccharomyces Genome Database (SGD)
- SILVA
- STRING
- UCSC Genome Browser
- UniProt
- VEuPathDB
- WormBase
- ZFIN: The Zebrafish Information Network
