= List of systems biology visualization software =

== Online software ==
Name	Description	Site
GESTALT Workbench	graphical workbench for analysis of large-scale genomic sequence data	
N-Browse	interactive graphical browser for biological networks	
NetPath	curated resource of human signal transduction pathways	
MEGA	free, online, open-source, phylogenetic analysis, drawing dendrograms etc.	
REACTOME	free, online, open-source, curated pathway database encompassing many areas of human biology	
WikiPathways	curate biological pathways	
MetaboMAPS	visualize omics data on shared metabolic pathways	

== Applications ==
Name	Description	OS	License	Site
BioTapestry	interactive tool for building, visualizing, and simulating genetic regulatory networks	multiplatform (Java-based)	LGPL	
Cytoscape	data integration, network visualization, and analysis	multiplatform (Java-based)	LGPL	
GenMAPP	visualize and analyze genomic data in the context of pathways	Windows	Apache License	
MATLAB	tool for modeling, simulating, and analyzing dynamic biological systems	Windows, Linux, macOS	Proprietary	
MEGA	free, online, open-source, phylogenetic analysis, drawing dendrograms etc.	Windows/DOS-Win/Mac/Linux	Shareware	
PathVisio	tool for displaying and editing biological pathways	multiplatform (Java-based)	Apache License	
InCroMAP	tool for the integration of omics data and joint visualization of experimental data in pathways	multiplatform (Java-based)	LGPL	
Pathview	pathway based data integration and visualization, easy to use and integrate into pathway analysis	multiplatform (R/Bioconductor)	GPL	
SBMLDiagrams	Python API to display and edit SBML layout/render extension	multiplatform	MIT	
Systrip	analysis of time-series data in the context of biological networks	Windows, Linux	LGPL, GPL	
