= STRING =

Biological database

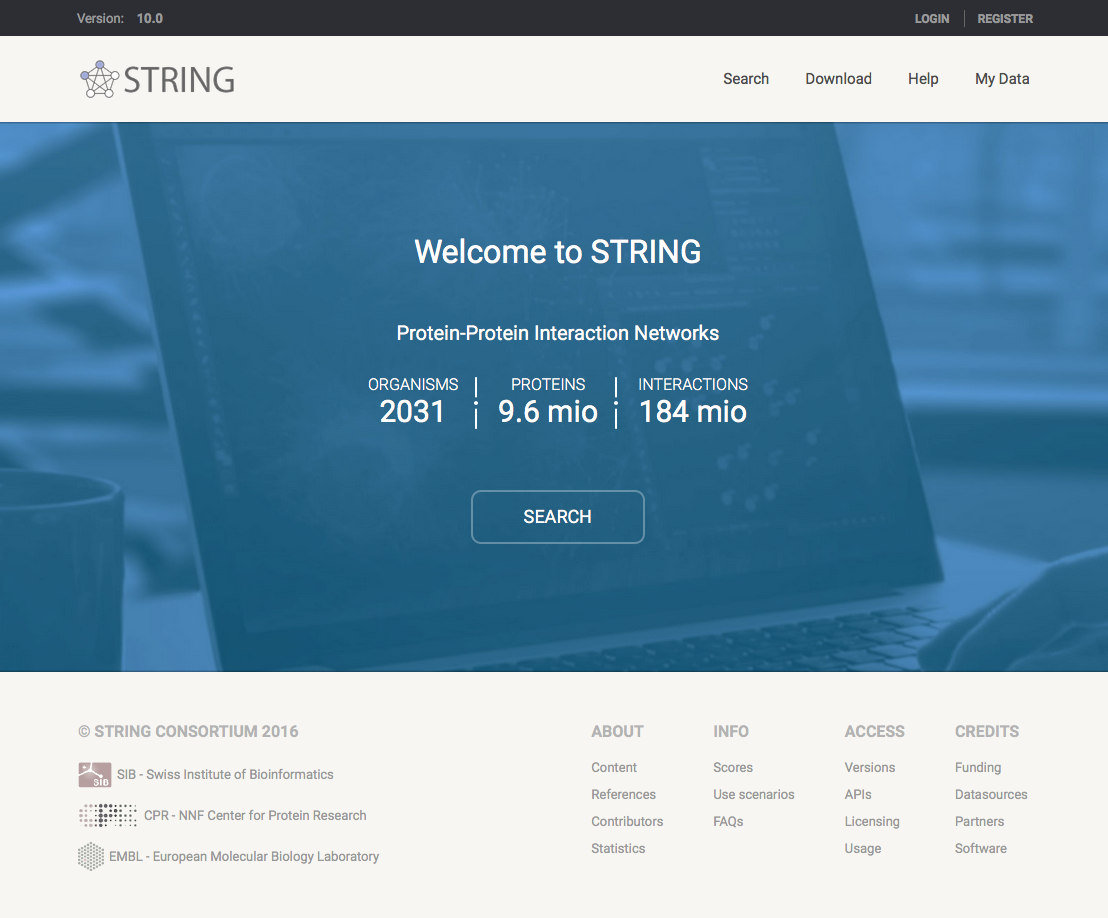

Content
- Description: Search Tool for the Retrieval of Interacting Genes/Proteins

Contact
- Research center: Academic Consortium
- Primary citation: PMID 30476243

Access
- Website: STRING website
- Download URL: url
- Web service URL: rest

Miscellaneous
- Version: 12.0 (July 2023)

In molecular biology, STRING (Search Tool for the Retrieval of Interacting Genes/Proteins, previously Search Tool for Recurring Instances of Neighbouring Genes) is a biological database and web resource of known and predicted protein–protein interactions.

The STRING database contains information from numerous sources, including experimental data, computational prediction methods and public text collections. It is freely accessible and it is regularly updated. The resource also serves to highlight functional enrichments in user-provided lists of proteins, using a number of functional classification systems such as GO, Pfam and KEGG. The latest version 11b contains information on about 59 million proteins from more than 12,000 organisms. STRING has been developed by a consortium of academic institutions including CPR, EMBL, KU, SIB, TUD and UZH.

== Usage ==
Protein–protein interaction networks are an important ingredient for the system-level understanding of cellular processes. Such networks can be used for filtering and assessing functional genomics data and for providing an intuitive platform for annotating structural, functional and evolutionary properties of proteins. Exploring the predicted interaction networks can suggest new directions for future experimental research and provide cross-species predictions for efficient interaction mapping.

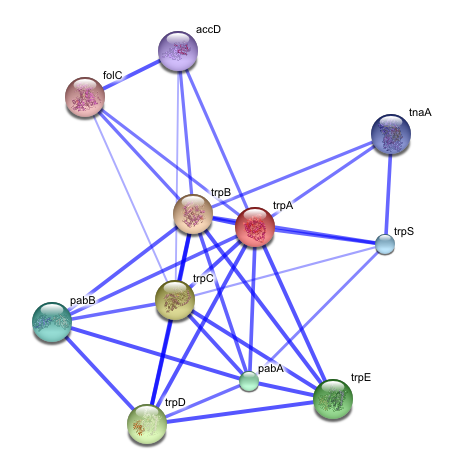
Protein–protein interaction network visualized by STRING. In this view, the color saturation of the edges represents the confidence score of a functional association

== Features ==
The data is weighted and integrated and a confidence score is calculated for all protein interactions. Results of the various computational predictions can be inspected from different designated views. There are two modes of STRING: Protein-mode and COG-mode. Predicted interactions are propagated to proteins in other organisms for which interaction has been described by inference of orthology. A web interface is available to access the data and to give a fast overview of the proteins and their interactions. A plug-in for cytoscape to use STRING data is available. Another possibility to access data STRING is to use the application programming interface (API) by constructing a URL that contain the request.

== Data sources ==
Like many other databases that store protein association knowledge, STRING imports data from experimentally derived protein–protein interactions through literature curation. Furthermore, STRING also store computationally predicted interactions from: (i) text mining of scientific texts, (ii) interactions computed from genomic features, and (iii) interactions transferred from model organisms based on orthology.

All predicted or imported interactions are benchmarked against a common reference of functional partnership as annotated by KEGG (Kyoto Encyclopedia of Genes and Genomes).

=== Imported data ===
STRING imports protein association knowledge from databases of physical interaction and databases of curated biological pathway knowledge (MINT, HPRD, BIND, DIP, BioGRID, KEGG, Reactome, IntAct, EcoCyc, NCI-Nature Pathway Interaction Database, GO). Links are supplied to the originating data of the respective experimental repositories and database resources.

=== Text mining ===
A large body of scientific texts (SGD, OMIM, FlyBase, PubMed) are parsed to search for statistically relevant co-occurrences of gene names.

=== Predicted data ===
- Neighborhood: Similar genomic context in different species suggest a similar function of the proteins.
- Fusion-fission events: Proteins that are fused in some genomes are very likely to be functionally linked (as in other genomes where the genes are not fused).
- Occurrence: Proteins that have a similar function or an occurrence in the same metabolic pathway, must be expressed together and have similar phylogenetic profile.
- Coexpression: Predicted association between genes based on observed patterns of simultaneous expression of genes.
