= ConsensusPathDB =

Biology database

Content
- Description: human functional interaction networks.
- Organisms: Homo sapiens, Saccharomyces cerevisiae, Mus musculus

Contact
- Research center: Max Planck Institute for Molecular Genetics
- Authors: Atanas Kamburov
- Primary citation: Kamburov et al. (2011)
- Release date: 2008

Access
- Data format: BioPAX; PSI-MI; SBML
- Website: consensuspathdb.org
- Download URL: yes
- Web service URL: yes

Miscellaneous
- Version: 30; 9 January 2015; 10 years ago

The ConsensusPathDB is a molecular functional interaction database, integrating information on protein interactions, genetic interactions signaling, metabolism, gene regulation, and drug-target interactions in humans. ConsensusPathDB currently (release 30) includes such interactions from 32 databases. ConsensusPathDB is freely available for academic use under http://ConsensusPathDB.org.

== Integrated Databases ==
- Reactome (metabolic and signaling pathways)
- KEGG (metabolic pathways only have been integrated in ConsensusPathDB)
- HumanCyc (metabolic pathways)
- PID - Pathway Interaction Database (signaling pathways)
- BioCarta (signaling pathways)
- Netpath (signaling pathways)
- IntAct (protein interactions)
- DIP (protein interactions)
- MINT (protein interactions)
- HPRD (protein interactions)
- BioGRID (protein interactions)
- SPIKE (protein interactions, signaling reactions)
- WikiPathways (metabolic and signaling pathways)
- and many more.

== Functionalities ==
The ConsensusPathDB is accessible via a web interface providing a variety of functions.

=== Search and visualization ===
Using the web interface users can search for physical entities (e.g. proteins, metabolites etc.) or pathways using common names or accession numbers (e.g. UniProt identifiers). Selected interactions can be visualized in an interactive environment as expandable networks. ConsensusPathDB currently allows users to export their models in BioPAX format or as image in several formats.

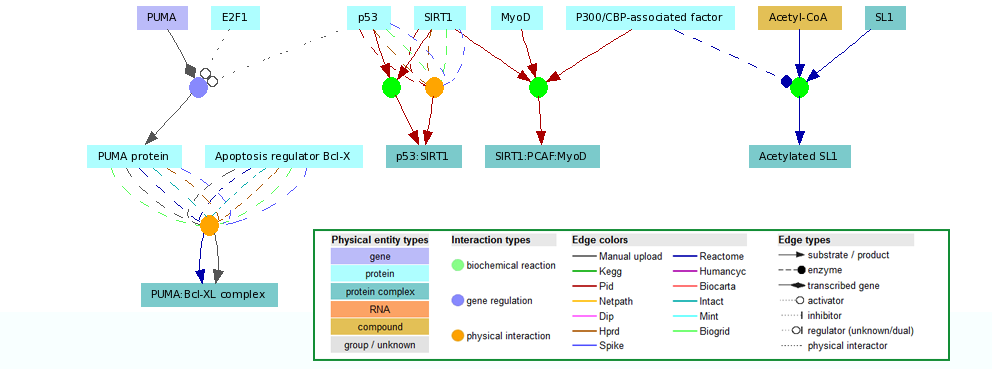

=== Shortest path ===
Users can search for shortest paths of functional interactions between physical entities, based on all interactions in the database. The pathway search can be constrained by forbidding passing through certain physical entities.

=== Data upload ===
Users can upload their own interaction networks in BioPAX, PSI-MI or SBML files in order to validate and/or extend those networks in the context of the interactions in ConsensusPathDB.

=== Over-representation analysis ===
Using the web-interface of the database, one can perform overrepresentation analysis, based on biochemical pathways or on neighbourhood-based entity sets (NESTs) that constitute sub-networks of the overall interaction network containing all physical entities around a central one within a "radius" (number of interactions from the center). For each predefined set (pathway / NEST), a P-value is computed based on the hypergeometric distribution. It reflects the significance of the observed overlap between the user-specific input gene list and the members of the predefined set.

Over-representation analyses can be performed with user-specified genes or metabolites.
