= Biological pathway =

Series of molecular interactions within a cell that produces some outcome

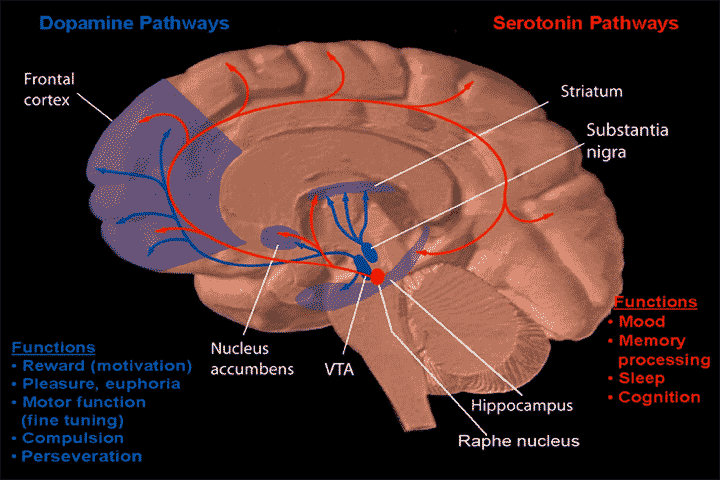
Example of dopamine and serotonin biological pathways.

In cell biology, a biological pathway is a series of molecular interactions among molecules within a cell that leads to a specific product or a change in the cell.

Biological pathways allow cells to respond to internal and external signals through biochemical reactions. They are involved in processes such as cell growth and development. These pathways can trigger the assembly of new molecules, such as fats or proteins, regulate gene expression, or stimulate cell movement.

Some of the most common biological pathways are involved in metabolism, gene regulation, and signal transduction. The study of biological pathways is important in advanced studies of genomics, systems biology, and medicine, as disruptions in these pathways are associated with diseases such as cancer.

== Types of biological pathways ==
Biological pathways can be classified into several major types based on their function.

- Metabolic pathways involve chemical reactions that convert molecules into energy or cellular building blocks, such as glycolysis.
- Genetic pathways regulate gene expression and control how genetic information is used within the cell.
- Signal transduction pathways transmit signals from outside the cell to the interior, allowing cells to respond to environmental changes.

== Mechanisms of biological pathways ==
Diagram receptor mechanism and signal transduction in a biological pathway.

Biological pathways function through a series of molecular interactions and transmit signals within and between cells.

Many pathways begin with the activation of receptor proteins in response to external signals such as hormones, growth factors, and other environmental factors.

Once activated, receptors initiate intracellular signaling cascades that include proteins, enzymes, and secondary messengers that send and amplify the signal.

Signal amplification allows a single molecular interaction to trigger effects within the cell.

== Examples of biological pathways ==
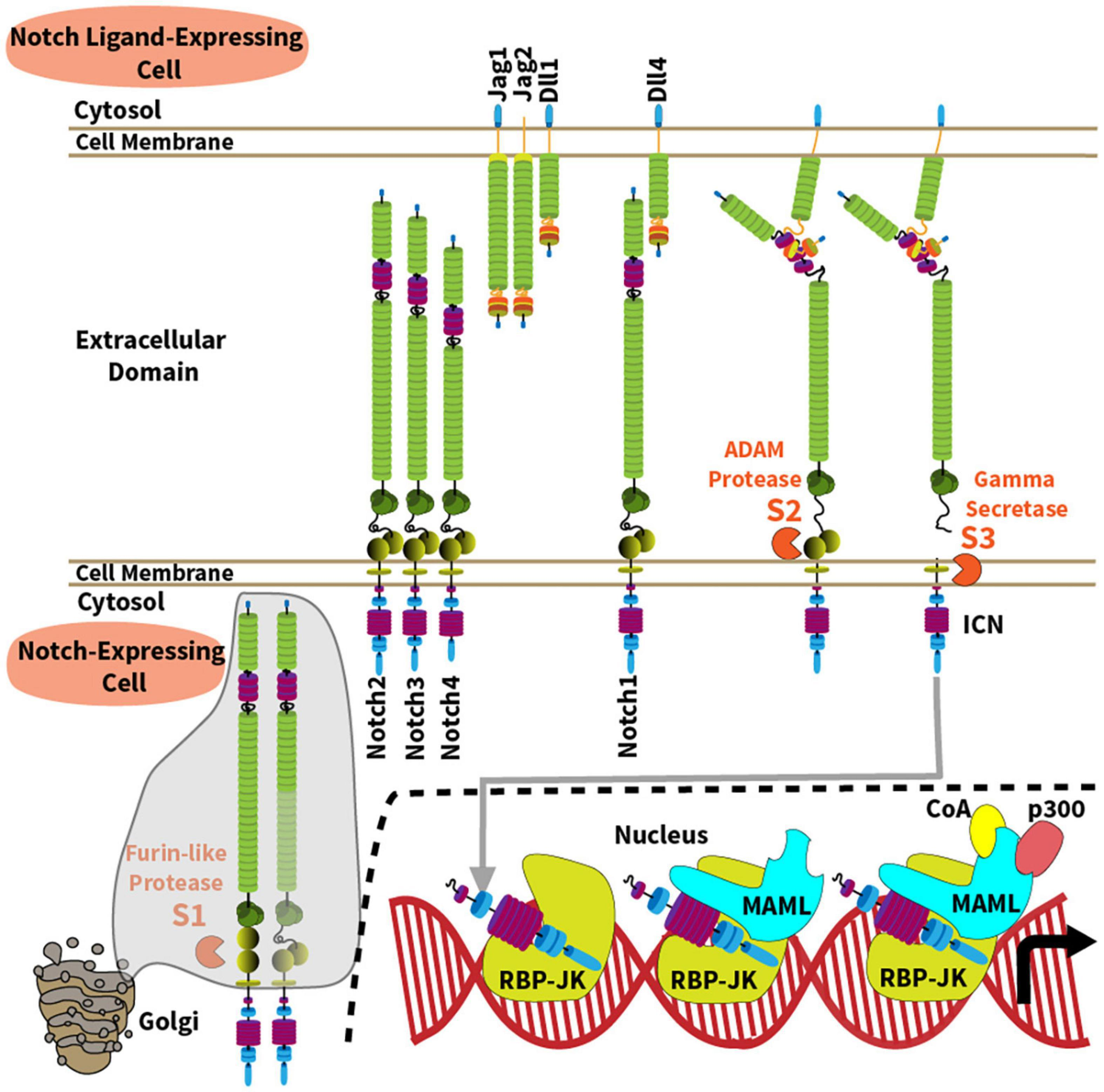
Overview of Notch signaling pathway, showing interaction between the receptors and the ligands.

Biological pathways can be illustrated through various signaling systems that regulate gene expression and cellular responses.

Below are some signaling pathway examples:

- The Notch signaling pathway is a cell communication system that regulates gene expression and controls cell development.
- The Hedgehog signaling pathway controls cell growth and pattern formation during embryonic development and is essential for proper tissue organization.
- The ethylene signaling pathway is found in plants and regulates processes such as fruit ripening, leaf abscission, and responses to environmental stress.

== Biological pathways and disease ==
Disruptions in biological pathways can lead to disease.

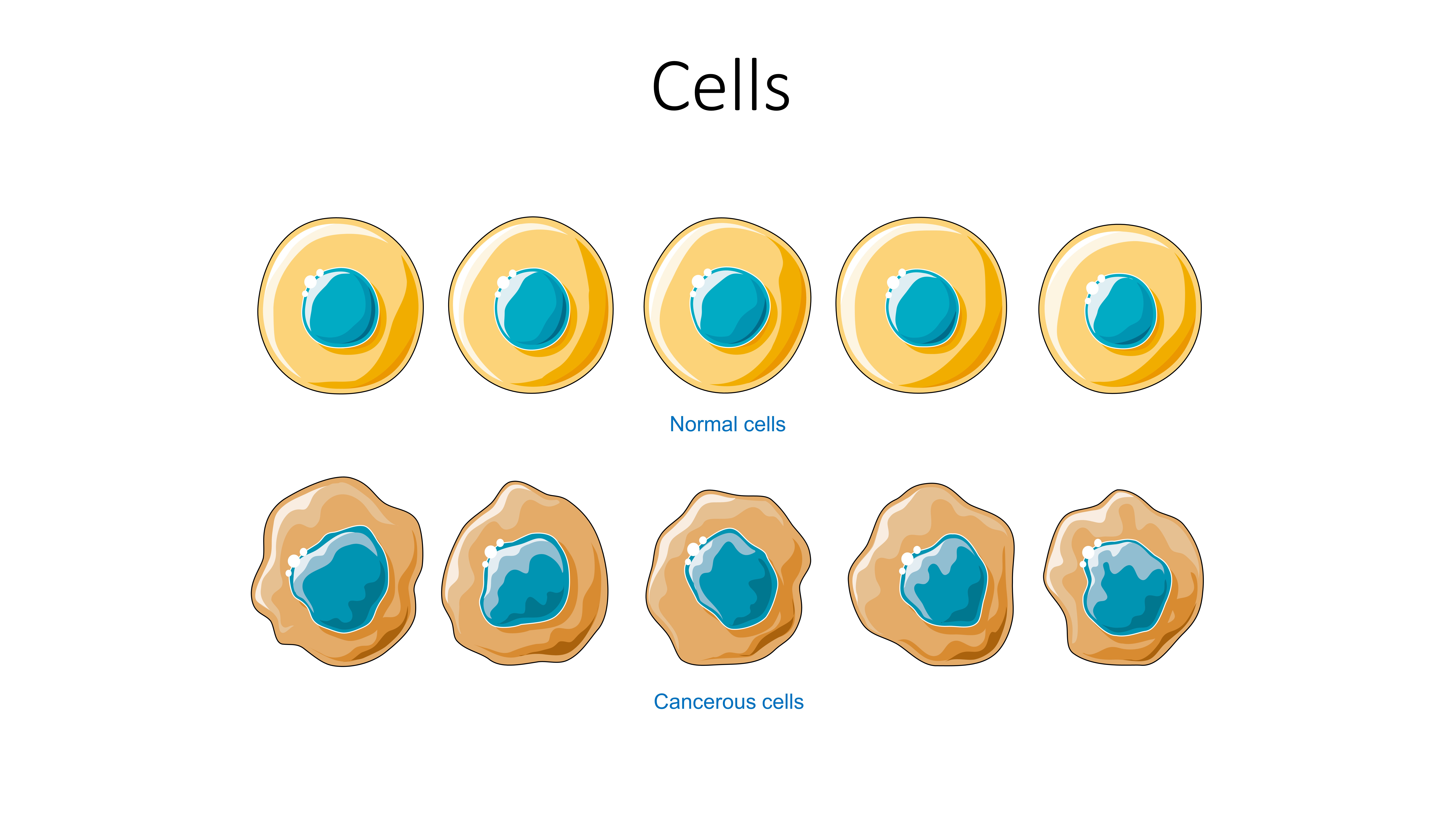
Infographic of the differences between normal and cancerous cells.

Abnormal signaling pathways are associated with cancer, where mutations can cause uncontrolled cell growth and division. These changes in pathways that regulate cells can contribute to the development of tumors.

== Pathway reconstruction ==
Pathway analysis and reconstruction involves using experimental data and computational models to identify interactions between receptors, intracellular molecules, and transcription factors. These approaches can help predict previously unknown components of signaling pathways.

Recent computational methods can be used to analyze signaling pathways by identifying paths between molecules in larger networks. These techniques enable researchers to understand many different pathways and their structure and function.

== Pathways databases ==
- KEGG Pathway database is a popular pathway search database highly used by biologists.
- WikiPathways: A community curated pathway database with openly accessible pathway information.
- Reactome: A free, manually curated online database of biological pathways.
- NCI-Nature Pathway Interaction Database: A database of human cellular signaling pathways.
- PhosphoSitePlus is a database of observed post-translational modifications in human and mouse proteins; an online systems biology resource providing comprehensive information and tools for the study of protein post-translational modifications (PTMs) including phosphorylation, ubiquitination, acetylation and methylation.
- BioCyc database collection is an assortment of organism specific Pathway/Genome Databases.
- Human Protein Reference Database is a centralized platform to visually depict and integrate information pertaining to domain architecture, post-translational modifications, interaction networks and disease association for each protein in the human proteome (the last release was #9 in 2010).
- PANTHER (Protein ANalysis THrough Evolutionary Relationships) is a large curated biological database of gene/protein families and their functionally related subfamilies that can be used to classify and identify the function of gene products.
- TRANSFAC (TRANScription FACtor database) is a manually curated database of eukaryotic transcription factors, their genomic binding sites and DNA binding profiles (provided by geneXplain GmbH).
- MiRTarBase is a curated database of MicroRNA-Target Interactions.
- DrugBank is a comprehensive, high-quality, freely accessible, online database containing information on drugs and drug targets.
- esyN is a network viewer and builder that allows to import pathways from the biomodels database or from biogrid, flybase pombase and see what drugs interact with the proteins in your network.
- Comparative Toxicogenomics Database (CTD) is a public website and research tool that curates scientific data describing relationships between chemicals/drugs, genes/proteins, diseases, taxa, phenotypes, GO annotations, pathways, and interaction modules; CTD illuminates how environmental chemicals affect human health.
- Pathway Commons is a project and database that uses BioPAX language to convert, integrate and query other biological pathway and interaction databases.

== See also ==
- Proteostasis
- Cysteine metabolism
- Pathway analysis
