= SABIO-Reaction Kinetics Database =

SABIO-RK Database
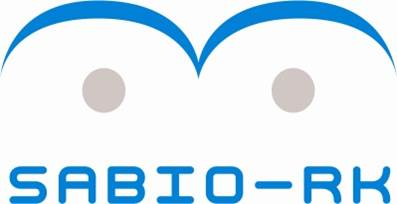

Content
- Description: Database for biochemical reactions and their kinetic properties
- Data types captured: Quantitative information on reaction dynamics
- Organisms: all

Contact
- Research center: Heidelberger Institut für Theoretische Studien
- Laboratory: Scientific Databases and Visualization
- Release date: 2006

Access
- Website: http://sabio.h-its.org
- Web service URL: http://sabio.h-its.org/layouts/content/webservices.gsp

Miscellaneous
- License: http://sabio.h-its.org/layouts/content/termscondition.gsp
- Curation policy: Curated database

SABIO-RK (System for the Analysis of Biochemical Pathways - Reaction Kinetics) is a web-accessible database storing information about biochemical reactions and their kinetic properties.

SABIO-RK comprises a reaction-oriented representation of quantitative information on reaction dynamics based on a given selected publication. This comprises all available kinetic parameters together with their corresponding rate equations, as well as kinetic law and parameter types and experimental and environmental conditions under which the kinetic data were determined. Additionally, SABIO-RK contains information about the underlying biochemical reactions and pathways including their reaction participants, cellular location and detailed information about the enzymes catalysing the reactions.

== SABIO-RK Database Content ==
The data stored in SABIO-RK in a comprehensive manner is mainly extracted manually from literature. This includes reactions, their participants (substrates, products), modifiers (inhibitors, activators, cofactors), catalyst details (e.g. EC enzyme classification, protein complex composition, wild type / mutant information), kinetic parameters together with corresponding rate equation, biological sources (organism, tissue, cellular location), environmental conditions (pH, temperature, buffer) and reference details. Data are adapted, normalized and annotated to controlled vocabularies, ontologies and external data sources including KEGG, UniProt, ChEBI, PubChem, NCBI, Reactome, BRENDA, MetaCyc, BioModels, and PubMed.
As of October 2021 SABIO-RK contains about 71.000 curated single entries extracted from more than 7.300 publications.
Several tools, databases and workflows in Systems Biology make use of SABIO-RK biochemical reaction data by integration into their framework including SYCAMORE, MeMo-RK, CellDesigner, PeroxisomeDB, Taverna workflows or tools like KineticsWizard software for data capture and analysis. Additionally, SABIO-RK is part of MIRIAM registry, a set of guidelines for the annotation and curation of computational models

== SABIO-RK Database Access ==
The usage of SABIO-RK is free of charge. Commercial users need a license. SABIO-RK offers several ways for data access:

- a browser-based interface
- RESTful-based web services for programmatic access

Result data sets can be exported in different formats including SBML, BioPAX/SBPAX, and table format.

== External References ==
- SABIO-RK homepage
