= GeneNetwork =

Database and analysis software for systems genetics

- Developers: GeneNetwork Development Team, University of Tennessee
- Release: 15 January 1994; 32 years ago
- Stable release: 2.0 / 29 May 2016; 10 years ago
- Written in: JavaScript, HTML, Python, CSS, CoffeeScript, PHP
- License: Affero General Public License
- Website: www.genenetwork.org
- Repository: github.com/genenetwork/genenetwork2

GeneNetwork is a combined database and open-source bioinformatics data analysis software resource for systems genetics. This resource is used to study gene regulatory networks that link DNA sequence differences to corresponding differences in gene and protein expression and to variation in traits such as health and disease risk. Data sets in GeneNetwork are typically made up of large collections of genotypes (e.g., SNPs) and phenotypes from groups of individuals, including humans, strains of mice and rats, and organisms as diverse as Drosophila melanogaster, Arabidopsis thaliana, and barley. The inclusion of genotypes makes it practical to carry out web-based gene mapping to discover those regions of genomes that contribute to differences among individuals in mRNA, protein, and metabolite levels, as well as differences in cell function, anatomy, physiology, and behavior.

== History ==
Development of GeneNetwork started at the University of Tennessee Health Science Center in 1994 as a web-based version of the Portable Dictionary of the Mouse Genome (1994). GeneNetwork is both the first and the longest continuously operating web service in biomedical research [see List of websites founded before 1995]. In 1999 the Portable Gene Dictionary was combined with Kenneth F. Manly's Map Manager QT mapping program to produce an online system for real-time genetic analysis. In early 2003, the first large Affymetrix gene expression data sets (whole mouse brain mRNA and hematopoietic stem cells) were incorporated and the system was renamed WebQTL. GeneNetwork is now developed by an international group of developers and has mirror and development sites in Europe, Asia, and Australia. Production services are hosted on systems at University of Tennessee Health Science Center with a backup instance in Europe.

A the current production version of GeneNetwork (also known as GN2) was released in 2016. The current version of GeneNetwork uses the same database as its predecessor, GN1, but has much more modular and maintainable open source code (available on GitHub). GeneNetwork now also has significant new features including support for:

- Genetically complex populations using linear mixed model implemented with an updated version of GEMMA ,
- R/qtl modules with many mapping options, including mapping of 4-way intercrosses and heterogeneous stock
- Weighted correlation network analysis, also known as WGCNA
- Cytoscape network display
- Correlated trait loci mapping
- A genome browser to display genetic and genomic data that is based on Biodalliance
- Linked modules to the Bayesian Network Webserver , for causal modeling

== Organization and use ==
GeneNetwork consists of two major components:

- Massive collections of genetic, genomic, and phenotype data for large cohorts of individuals
- Sophisticated statistical analysis and gene mapping software that enable analysis of molecular and cellular networks and genotype-to-phenotype relations

Four levels of data are usually obtained for each family or population:

1. DNA sequences and genotypes
2. Molecular expression data often generated using arrays, RNA-seq, epigenomic, proteomic, metabolomic, and metagenomic methods (molecular phenotypes)
3. Standard quantitative phenotypes that are often parts of a typical medical record (e.g., blood chemistry, body weight)
4. Annotation files and metadata for traits and data sets

The combined data types are housed together in a relational database and IPSF fileserver, and are conceptually organized and grouped by species, cohort, and family. The system is implemented as a LAMP (software bundle) stack. Code and a simplified version of the MariaDB database are available on GitHub.

GeneNetwork is primarily used by researchers, but has also been adopted successfully for undergraduate and graduate courses in genetics and bioinformatics (see YouTube example), bioinformatics, physiology, and psychology. Researchers and students typically retrieve sets of genotypes and phenotypes from one or more families and use built-in statistical and mapping functions to explore relations among variables and to assemble networks of associations. Key steps include the analysis of these factors:

1. The range of variation of traits
2. Covariation among traits (scatterplots and correlations, principal component analysis)
3. Architecture of larger networks of traits
4. Quantitative trait locus mapping and causal models of the linkage between sequence differences and phenotype differences

== Data sources ==
Traits and molecular expression data sets are submitted by researchers directly or are extracted from repositories such as National Center for Biotechnology Information Gene Expression Omnibus. Data cover a variety of cells and tissues—from single cell populations of the immune system, specific tissues (retina, prefrontal cortex), to entire systems (whole brain, lung, muscle, heart, fat, kidney, flower, whole plant embryos). A typical data set covers hundreds of fully genotyped individuals and may also include technical and biological replicates. Genotypes and phenotypes are usually taken from peer-reviewed papers. GeneNetwork includes annotation files for several RNA profiling platforms (Affymetrix, Illumina, and Agilent). RNA-seq and quantitative proteomic, metabolomic, epigenetics, and metagenomic data are also available for several species, including mouse and human.

== Tools and features ==
There are tools on the site for a wide range of functions that range from simple graphical displays of variation in gene expression or other phenotypes, scatter plots of pairs of traits (Pearson or rank order), construction of both simple and complex network graphs, analysis of principal components and synthetic traits, QTL mapping using marker regression, interval mapping, and pair scans for epistatic interactions. Most functions work with up to 100 traits and several functions work with an entire transcriptome.

The database can be browsed and searched at the main search page. An on-line tutorial is available. Users can also download the primary data sets as text files, Excel, or in the case of network graphs, as SBML. As of 2017, GN2 is available as a beta release.

== Code ==
GeneNetwork is an open source project released under the Affero General Public License (AGPLv3). The majority of code is written in Python, but includes modules and other code written in C, R, and JavaScript. The code is mainly Python 2.4. GN2 is mainly written in Python 2.7 in a Flask framework with Jinja2 HTML templates) but with conversion to Python 3.X planned over the next few years. GN2 calls many statistical procedures written in the R programming language. The original source code from 2010 along with a compact database are available on SourceForge. While GN1 was actively maintained through 2019 GitHub, as of 2020 all work is focused on GN2.

== See also ==
- Computational genomics
- Cytoscape
- KEGG (The Kyoto Encyclopedia of Genes and Genomes)
- Reactome
- WikiPathways
