= Keio Collection =

Mutant srains of Escherichia coli

The Keio Collection (2006) is a set of 3,985 mutants of Escherichia coli strain K-12 BW25113, which has played a key role in understanding systematic genomics. The purpose of this collection was to determine the function of all nonessential genes in Escherichia coli. The Keio Collection gets its name from Keio University in Tokyo, Japan.

== History/Timeline ==
In the year 2000, Researchers Kirill Datsenko and Barry Wanner worked on creating method called λ Red which was a recombination method. Development of λ Red allowed for specific deletion of genes within the E.coli Genome. In 2006 the paper "Construction of Escherichia coli K-12 in-frame, single-gene knockout mutants: the Keio collection" was published. By late 2010 the collection had been set as standard for biotechnology, the paper garnered upwards of 3800 citations. As of 2025, the Keio Collection has also been a corner-stone in the development of new bioinformatics tool in the EcoCyc database that allows for a comprehensive catalog of each part of the E.coli system that works as a metabolic flux model.

== Process ==
Escherichia coli was chosen for this collection because it is a well-studied organism that is easy to genetically modify. 4,288 genes were selected for single gene deletion and were replaced with a kanamycin resistance marker to select for mutant growth. Gene deletions were performed through homologous recombination, ensuring nearby genomic region were not disrupted. 3,985 of these genes were successfully deleted and were determined to be nonessential genes.

== Applications ==
The aim of the study is to understand how genes influence E. coli as a cellular system. Through proper examination, researchers have been able to identify genes responsible for cell morphology, interactive metabolites, and antibiotic sensitivity. These genes have been essential in the development of antibiotics, allowing scientist to focus on specific encoded parts of the cell. The collection is also widely used in systems biology to examine gene networks and interactions in bacteria. In addition to that, high-throughput screening using the Keio Collection allows rapid identification of gene functions across various environmental conditions.The Keio Collection has also been used to study metabolic pathways and identify genes involved in cellular metabolism under different nutrient conditions.

== Research advancement ==
The Keio collection has changed the way researchers perform genomic tests. The compiling of this complete set of Escherichia coli's gene knockout strains has made testing individual genes less time and labor intensive compared to traditional methods. Researchers could perform high-throughput studies, examining “more than 65,000 data points” from close to 4,000 mutants. The Keio collection becoming more popularized led to results that were replicable and could be compared between different project teams and institutions. This uniformity resulted in the development of standardized techniques and shared protocols for large phenotypic screenings. This standardization and efficiency in screening was very important in advancing Functional Genomics, the study of individual gene function and the effect on more complex systems and overall cell behavior. Genes function differently when environmental conditions vary. Due to this, genes needed to be tested multiple times in different environmental conditions to determine if they were functional or not, resulting more numerous screenings. The efficiency and standardization of these protocols enable data to be compared confidently between institutions. This increased the speed that accurate gene function predictions could be uploaded into genome and pathway databases such as EcoCyc.

== Modern updates ==
Due to advancements in Gene Sequencing and constant study it was discovered that there's actually 4,296 ORFs regions in 2008. 37 incorrect mutant strands were discovered due to gene duplications. Additionally, 299 ORFs were found as likely candidates for essential genes during the study. The Keio Collection has also allowed researchers to develop new methods of screening by using the model E.coli as a foundation for new studies on other organisms. Sequential technology advancements have also improved the accuracy of identifying essential and non essential genes in E.coli.

== Limitations ==
The Keio Collection was published February 21, 2006. These mutants have been sub-cultured to perform a variety of different biological research. Spontaneous mutations should strongly be considered with regards to accuracy for these mutants. Frame-shift and nonsense mutations could lead to drastic biological changes in these mutants, which can be wrongly attributed to the knock-out gene. Another limitation is that gene deletions may cause polar effects, affecting the expression of downstream genes in operons. Environmental factors may also affect the designation of a gene, essentially, resulting in variability depending on growth conditions.
