= Chenette =

Chenette is a surname. Notable people with the surname include:

- Emily Chenette, American biochemist
- Justin Chenette (born 1991), American politician
- Madeleine Chenette, Canadian politician
