= Clingen (disambiguation) =

Clingen is a town in Germany.

Clingen may also refer to:

- Clinical Genome Resource

== See also ==
- Clin. Genet. (Clinical Genetics), a medical genetics journal
