= PathVisio =

Software for pathway editing and visualisation

- Initial release: 2008
- Stable release: 3.3.0 / January 28, 2018
- Written in: Java
- Operating system: Any (Java-based)
- Type: Pathways editing, analysis, visualization
- License: Apache 2.0
- Website: www.pathvisio.org
- Repository: github.com/PathVisio

PathVisio is a free open-source pathway analysis and drawing software. It allows drawing, editing, and analyzing biological pathways. Visualization of ones experimental data on the pathways for finding relevant pathways that are over-represented in your data set is possible.

PathVisio provides a basic set of features for pathway drawing, analysis and visualization. Additional features are available as plugins.

== History ==
PathVisio was created primarily at Maastricht University and Gladstone Institutes. The software is developed in Java and it's also used as part of the WikiPathways framework as an applet. Starting from version 3.0 (released in 2012) plugins are OSGi compliant and a plugin directory, describing them, was developed. In 2015 version 3.2 was released. This was the first signed version with a certificate issued by a certification authority. Many of the running issues introduced by java 1.7 and 1.8 with the new security rules were solved. Since 2013 a javascript version (PVJS) is being developed to replace the applet. From 2015 it also allows small edits and in the future it will be a full editor.

== Features ==
- Pathway drawing and annotation
- Pathway analysis
- Integration with WikiPathways for easy editing/publishing
- Integration with Cytoscape
- Integration with other programming languages via PathVisioRPC
