= WikiPathways =

Database of biological pathways

WikiPathways: an open resource for biological pathways.
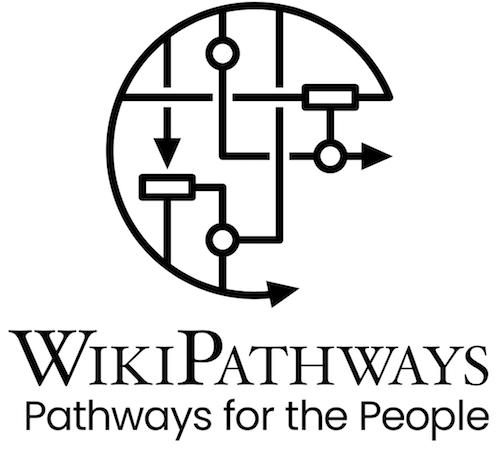

Content
- Description: A wiki-based resource for collection, maintenance and distribution of biological pathways

Contact
- Primary citation: PMID 18651794

Access
- Data format: GPML; BioPAX
- Website: http://www.wikipathways.org
- Download URL: Pathways
- Web service URL: REST
- Sparql endpoint: https://sparql.wikipathways.org/sparql

Miscellaneous
- License: Creative Commons 0
- Data release frequency: monthly

WikiPathways is a community resource for contributing and maintaining content dedicated to biological pathways. Any registered WikiPathways user can contribute, and anybody can become a registered user. Contributions are monitored by a group of admins, but the bulk of peer review, editorial curation, and maintenance is the responsibility of the user community. WikiPathways is originally built using MediaWiki software, a custom graphical pathway editing tool (PathVisio) and integrated BridgeDb databases covering major gene, protein, and metabolite systems. WikiPathways was founded in 2007 by Thomas Kelder, Alex Pico, Martijn Van Iersel, Kristina Hanspers, Bruce Conklin and Chris Evelo, and was first published in 2008. Current architects are Martina Summer-Kutmon and Egon Willighagen.

== Pathway content ==
Each article at WikiPathways is dedicated to a particular pathway. Many types of molecular pathways are covered, including metabolic, signaling, regulatory, etc. and the supported species include human, mouse, zebrafish, fruit fly, C. elegans, yeast, rice and arabidopsis, as well as bacteria and plant species. Using a search feature, one can locate a particular pathway by name, by the genes and proteins it contains, or by the text displayed in its description. The pathway collection can also be browsed with combinations of species names and ontology-based categories.

In addition to the pathway diagram, each pathway page also includes a description, bibliography, pathway version history and list of component genes and proteins with linkouts to public resources. For individual pathway nodes, users can access a list of other pathways with that node. Pathway changes can be monitored by displaying previous revisions or by viewing differences between specific revisions. Using the pathway history one can also revert to a previous revision of a pathway. Pathways can also be tagged with ontology terms from three major BioPortal ontologies (Pathway, Disease and Cell Type).

The pathway content at WikiPathways is freely available for download in several data and image formats. WikiPathways is completely open access and open source. All content is available under Creative Commons 0. All source code for WikiPathways and the PathVisio editor is available under the Apache License, Version 2.0.

== Access and integration ==
In addition to various primary data formats (e.g. GPML, BioPAX, Reactome, KEGG, and RDF), WikiPathways supports a variety of ways to integrate and interact with pathway content. These include directed link-outs, image maps, RSS feeds and deep web services. This enables reuse in projects like COVID19 Disease Map.

WikiPathways content is used to annotate and cross-link Wikipedia articles covering various genes, proteins, metabolites and pathways. Here are a few examples:

- Citric acid cycle § Interactive pathway map
- Articles that link to Citric acid cycle template
- Category:WikiPathways templates

Many other database link to WikiPathways for biological process information, including PubChem, LIPID MAPS, and Xenbase.

== See also ==
- Reactome
- Pathway Commons
- KEGG
- GenMAPP
- PathVisio
- Genenetwork
- Cytoscape
- BioPAX
