= International Molecular Exchange Consortium =

International Molecular Exchange Consortium

The International Molecular Exchange Consortium (IMEx) is a group of the major public providers of molecular interaction data to provide a single, non-redundant set of molecular interactions. Data is captured using a detailed curation model and made available in the PSI-MI standard formats. Participating databases include DIP, IntAct, the Molecular Interaction Database (MINT), MatrixDB, InnateDB, IID, HPIDB, UCL Cardiovascular Gene Annotation, MBInfo, Molecular Connections and UniProt. The group collates the interaction data and prevents duplicate entries in the various databases. The IMEx consortium also supports and contributes to the development of the HUPO-PSI-MI XML format, which is now widely implemented.

== External references ==
IMEx website
