= NCI-Nature Pathway Interaction Database =

PID

Content
- Description: Pathway Interaction Database.

Contact
- Laboratory: National Cancer Institute; NIH; Nature Publishing Group
- Primary citation: Schaefer & al. (2009)
- Release date: 2005

Access
- Standards: BioPAX
- Data format: XML
- Website: http://www.ndexbio.org

The Pathway Interaction Database (PID) is a free biomedical database of human cellular signaling pathways. The database contains information about the molecular interactions and reactions that take place in cells, with a particular focus on processes that might be relevant to cancer research and treatment. The database was established as collaboration between the U.S. National Cancer Institute, NIH and Nature Publishing Group in 2005 and was launched in November 2006. In September 2012, active curation was stopped and the PID data are now available in the Network Data Exchange, NDEx.

== Database content ==
As of November 2007, the database contained 59 pathways (comprising 3309 molecular interactions) curated by the NCI-Nature editorial team. New pathways are added each month. The database also contains 254 pathways (comprising 3003 interactions) imported from the June 2004 edition of the BioCarta pathway database.

The NCI-Nature curated data is gathered from published research literature and reviewed by expert scientists before publication. Evidence codes are assigned to each molecular interaction, which allows users to evaluate the reliability of the interactions or to search for interactions identified by particular experimental techniques.

== Data output and download ==
The database content can be viewed in self-contained, pre-defined pathways. The database can also dynamically generate interaction networks to visualize the results of database searches. Pathways and dynamically generated networks are displayed in GIF and SVG images and can be downloaded as XML (including the standard pathway interchange format, BioPAX). The entire database is also available for download.

== See also ==
- Reactome
- KEGG
- Human Protein Reference Database
- Cancer Genome Project

== Other references ==
- An Introduction to the NCI-Nature Pathway Interaction Database
- Identification of Key Processes Underlying Cancer Phenotypes Using Biologic Pathway Analysis
