= PLOS One =

Peer-reviewed open-access scientific journal

PLOS ONE
- Discipline: Multidisciplinary
- Language: English
- Edited by: Emily Chenette

Publication details
- History: Since 2006
- Publisher: Public Library of Science
- Frequency: Upon acceptance
- Open access: Yes
- License: Creative Commons Attribution License 4.0 International
- Impact factor: 2.8 (2025)

Standard abbreviations
- ISO 4: PLOS ONE

Indexing
- ISSN: 1932-6203
- LCCN: 2006214532
- OCLC no.: 228234657

Links
- Journal homepage

PLOS One (stylized PLOS ONE, and formerly PLoS ONE) is a peer-reviewed open access mega journal published by the Public Library of Science (PLOS) since 2006. The journal covers primary research from any discipline within science and medicine. The Public Library of Science began in 2000 with an online petition initiative by Nobel Prize winner Harold Varmus, formerly director of the National Institutes of Health and at that time director of Memorial Sloan–Kettering Cancer Center; Patrick O. Brown, a biochemist at Stanford University; and Michael Eisen, a computational biologist at the University of California, Berkeley, and the Lawrence Berkeley National Laboratory.

Submissions are subject to an article processing charge and, according to the journal, papers are not to be excluded on the basis of lack of perceived importance or adherence to a scientific field. All submissions go through a pre-publication review by a member of the board of academic editors, who can elect to seek an opinion from an external reviewer. In January 2010, the journal was included in the Journal Citation Reports and received its first impact factor of 4.4. Its 2025 impact factor is 2.8. Papers are published under Creative Commons licenses.

== History ==
=== Development ===
The Gordon and Betty Moore Foundation awarded PLOS a $9 million grant in December 2002 and $1 million grant in May 2006 for its financial sustainability and launch of new free-access biomedical journals. Later, PLOS One was launched in December 2006 as a beta version named PLoS One. It launched with commenting and note-making functionality, and added the ability to rate articles in July 2007. In September 2007, the ability to leave "trackbacks" on articles was added. In August 2008, the journal moved from a weekly to a daily publication schedule, publishing articles as soon as they became ready. PLOS One came out of "beta" in October 2008.

In September 2009, as part of its article-level metrics program, PLOS One made its full online usage data, including HTML page views and PDF or XML download statistics, publicly available for every published article. In mid-2012, as part of a rebranding of PLoS as PLOS, the journal changed its name to PLOS One.

=== Output and turnaround ===
Year	Papers Published
2007	1,200
2008	2,800
2009	4,406
2010	6,749
2011	13,798
2012	23,468
2013	31,500
2014	30,040
2015	28,107
2016	22,054
2017	21,185
2018	18,859
2019	16,318
2020	15,794
2021	16,093
2022	15,336
2023	14,332
2024	17,263
2025	18,949

The number of papers published by PLOS One grew rapidly from inception to 2013 and has since declined somewhat. By 2010, it was estimated to have become the largest journal in the world, and in 2011, 1 in 60 articles indexed by PubMed were published by PLOS One. By September 2017, PLOS One confirmed they had published over 200,000 articles. By November 2017, the journal Scientific Reports overtook PLOS One in terms of output.

At PLOS One, the median review time has grown from 37 days to 125 days over the first ten years of operation, according to Himmelstein's analysis, done for Nature. The median between acceptance and posting a paper on the site has decreased from 35 to 15 days over the same period. Both numbers for 2016 roughly correspond to the industry-wide averages for biology-related journals. The acceptance rate decreased from around 50% to 31% between January 2021 and June 2023.

=== Management ===
The founding managing editor was Chris Surridge. He was succeeded by Peter Binfield in March 2008, who was publisher until May 2012. Damian Pattinson then held the chief editorial position until December 2015. Joerg Heber was as editor-in-chief from November 2016 before Emily Chenette took over in that position in March 2021.

== Publication concept ==
PLOS One is built on several conceptually different ideas compared to traditional peer-reviewed scientific publishing in that it does not use the perceived importance of a paper as a criterion for acceptance or rejection. The idea is that, instead, PLOS One only verifies whether experiments and data analysis were conducted rigorously, and leaves it to the scientific community to ascertain importance, post publication, through debate and comment.

The review process starts with initial checks by the journal's staff and in-house editorial team to verify compliance with policy and ethical standards, competing interests, financial disclosure and data availability. Then, the academic editor, usually a member of PLOS One's editorial board who has relevant expertise, reviews the paper and decides whether an external peer review is needed for expert feedback. Based on the review and any feedback, the academic editor can accept, reject, or request a minor or major revision.

According to Nature, the journal's aim is to "challenge academia's obsession with journal status and impact factors". Being an online-only publication allows PLOS One to publish more papers than a print journal. In an effort to facilitate publication of research on topics outside, or between, traditional science categories, it does not restrict itself to a specific scientific area.

Papers published in PLOS One can be of any length, contain full color throughout, and contain supplementary materials such as multimedia files. Reuse of articles is subject to a Creative Commons Attribution License. In the first four years following launch, it made use of over 40,000 external peer reviewers. The journal uses an international board of academic editors with over 6,000 academics handling submissions and publishes approximately 50% of all submissions, after review by, on average, 2.9 experts. Registered readers can leave comments on articles on the website.

== Business model ==
A welcome message from PLoS to Nature Publishing Group on the launch of Scientific Reports, inspired by a similar message sent in 1981 by Apple to IBM upon the latter's entry into the personal computer market with its IBM Personal Computer

As with all journals of the Public Library of Science, open access to PLOS One is financed by an article processing charge, typically paid by the author's institution or by the author. This model allows PLOS journals to make all articles available to the public for free immediately upon publication. As of April 2021, PLOS One charges a publication fee of $1,745 to publish an article. Depending on circumstances, it may waive or reduce the fee for authors who do not have sufficient funds.

PLoS had been operating at a loss until 2009 but covered its operational costs for the first time in 2010, largely due to the growth of PLOS One. The success of PLOS One has inspired a series of other open access journals, including some other mega journals having broad scope, low selectivity, and a pay-to-publish model using Creative Commons licenses.

== Reception ==
In September 2009, PLOS One received the Publishing Innovation Award of the Association for Learned and Professional Society Publishers. The award is given in recognition of a "truly innovative approach to any aspect of publication as adjudged from originality and innovative qualities, together with utility, benefit to the community and long-term prospects". In January 2010, it was announced that the journal would be included in the Journal Citation Reports, and the journal received an impact factor of 4.411 in 2010. According to the Journal Citation Reports, the journal has a 2025 impact factor of 2.8.

== Abstracting and indexing ==
The journal is indexed in the Directory of Open Access Journals (DOAJ) and in major scientific databases, including:

- AGRICOLA
- BIOSIS Previews
- Chemical Abstracts Service
- Embase
- Food Science and Technology Abstracts
- MEDLINE/PubMed
- PsycINFO
- Scopus
- The Zoological Record
- Web of Science

== Response to controversial publications ==
=== Alleged sexism in one peer review instance ===
On April 29, 2015, Fiona Ingleby and Megan Head, postdoctoral fellows at the University of Sussex and Australian National University respectively, posted a rejection letter, which they said was sent to them by a peer reviewer for a journal they did not wish to name. The rejection letter concerned Ingleby and Head's paper about differences in PhD-to-postdoc transition between male and female scientists. The reviewer argued that the authors should "find one or two male biologists to work with" to ensure the manuscript does not drift into "ideologically biased assumptions", comments which the authors found to be "unprofessional and inappropriate" and veering into sexism. Shortly afterward, the journal was reported to be PLOS One. By May 1, PLOS had announced that it was severing ties with the reviewer responsible for the comments and asking the editor who relayed them to step down. PLOS One also issued an apology statement following the incident.

=== CreatorGate ===
On March 3, 2016, the editors of PLOS One initiated a reevaluation of an article about the functioning of the human hand due to outrage among the journal's readership over a reference to "Creator" inside the paper. The authors, who received grants from the Chinese National Basic Research Program and National Natural Science Foundation of China for this work, responded by saying "Creator" is a poorly translated idiom (造化(者); lit. 'that which creates or transforms') which means "nature" in the Chinese language. Despite the authors' protests, the article was retracted. A less sympathetic explanation for the use of "Creator" was suggested to The Chronicle of Higher Education by Chinese-language experts who noted that the academic editor listed on the paper, Renzhi Han, previously worked at the Chinese Evangelical Church in Iowa City.

Sarah Kaplan of The Washington Post presented a detailed analysis of the problem, which she named #CreatorGate, and concluded that the journal's hasty retraction may have been an even bigger offense than the publication of the paper in the first place. To contrast PLOS One's handling of the problem, she used a 12-year history of retraction of the fraudulent paper on vaccine and autism by The Lancet and the then (Note: The article eventually got retracted on 24 July 2025.) lack of a retraction of a debunked study on "arsenic life" by Science. Others added the history of the article in Nature on "water memory" that was not retracted either.

Jonathan Eisen, chair of the advisory board of a sister journal PLOS Biology and an advocate for open-access, commended PLOS One for their prompt response on social media, which in his words "most journals pretend doesn't even exist". David Knutson issued a statement about the paper processing at PLOS One, which praised the importance of post-publication peer review and described their intention to offer open signed reviews in order to ensure accountability of the process. From March 2 to 9, the research article received a total of 67 post-publication reader comments and 129 responses on PLOS One site. Signe Dean of SBS put #CreatorGate in perspective: it is not the most scandalous retraction in science, yet it shows how a social media outrage storm does expedite a retraction.

=== Rapid-onset gender dysphoria controversy ===
On August 27, 2018, the editors of PLOS One initiated a reevaluation of an article they published two weeks earlier submitted by Brown University School of Public Health assistant professor Lisa Littman. The study described a phenomenon of social contagion, or "cluster outbreaks" in gender dysphoria among young people, which Littman called "rapid-onset gender dysphoria". Data was obtained from a survey placed on three websites for concerned parents of children with gender dysphoria, asking for responses from parents whose children had experienced "sudden or rapid development of gender dysphoria beginning between the ages of 10 and 21". The study was criticized by transgender activists like Julia Serano and medical professionals like developmental and clinical psychologist Diane Ehrensaft, as being politicized and having self-selected samples, as well as lacking clinical data or responses from the adolescents themselves.

On March 19, 2019, PLOS One completed its review. PLOS One psychology academic editor Angelo Brandelli Costa acted as a reviewer criticizing the methods and conclusion of the study in a formal comment, saying, "The level of evidence produced by the Dr. Littman's study cannot generate a new diagnostic criterion relative to the time of presentation of the demands of medical and social gender affirmation." In a separate letter apologizing for the failure of peer review to address the issues with the article, PLOS One Editor-in-chief Joerg Heber said, "we have reached the conclusion that the study and resultant data reported in the article represent a valid contribution to the scientific literature. However, we have also determined that the study, including its goals, methodology, and conclusions, were not adequately framed in the published version, and that these needed to be corrected."

The paper was republished with updated Title, Abstract, Introduction, Methodology, Discussion, and Conclusion sections, but the Results section was mostly unchanged. In her correction, Littman emphasized that the article was "a study of parental observations which serves to develop hypotheses", saying "Rapid-onset gender dysphoria (ROGD) is not a formal mental health diagnosis at this time. This report did not collect data from the adolescents and young adults (AYAs) or clinicians and therefore does not validate the phenomenon. Additional research that includes AYAs, along with consensus among experts in the field, will be needed to determine if what is described here as rapid-onset gender dysphoria (ROGD) will become a formal diagnosis."
