= Emily Chenette =

American biochemist

- Education: University of North Carolina at Chapel Hill (PhD), Duke University (Postdoc)
- Known for: editing PLOS One
- Scientific career
- Fields: biochemistry

Emily Chenette is an American biochemist and journal editor. She is the editor-in-chief of PLOS One.

== Career ==
She received her Bachelor of Arts degree in biochemistry from Columbia University in 2000. Chenette received her doctorate in genetics and molecular biology from the University of North Carolina at Chapel Hill and did her postdoctoral research at Duke University.

After completing her postdoctoral research, she served as the associate editor at Signaling Gateway. In 2010, she became the Senior Editor at Nature Cell Biology. Then in 2015, she became the editorial manager for The FEBS Journal. In 2018, she joined the editorial team of PLOS One, originally as Senior Editor.
