= Peter Karp (scientist) =

American Computational Biologist

- Born: Peter D. Karp
- Education: University of Pennsylvania (BA); Stanford University (PhD)
- Known for: BioCyc database collection; MetaCyc; EcoCyc
- Awards: ISCB Fellow (2012)
- Scientific career
- Fields: Bioinformatics; Artificial Intelligence
- Workplaces: SRI International; National Center for Biotechnology Information
- Thesis: Hypothesis Formation and Qualitative Reasoning in Molecular Biology (1988)
- Academic advisors: Bruce Buchanan; Edward Feigenbaum; Peter Friedland; Charles Yanofsky
- Website: sri.com/about/people/peter-karp

Peter D. Karp is director of the Bioinformatics Research Group at SRI International in Menlo Park, California. Karp leads the development of the BioCyc database collection (which includes the highly curated EcoCyc and MetaCyc databases). BioCyc databases combine genome, metabolic pathway, and regulatory information for thousands of organisms.

== Education ==
Karp received his undergraduate degree from the University of Pennsylvania. He received a Ph.D. degree in computer science from Stanford University. His dissertation developed qualitative reasoning and machine learning techniques for hypothesis generation in molecular biology. Karp was a postdoctoral fellow at the National Library of Medicine.

== Honors and recognition ==
He was elected a fellow of the International Society for Computational Biology (ISCB) in 2012 for outstanding contributions to the fields of computational biology and bioinformatics. He is also a Fellow of the American Association for the Advancement of Science.
