= Pathway Commons =

Content
- Description: biological pathways.

Contact
- Research center: Memorial Sloan-Kettering Cancer Center and University of Toronto
- Laboratory: Computational Biology Center and G.Bader Lab
- Authors: Ethan G Cerami et al.
- Primary citation: Cerami & al. (2011)
- Release date: 2010

Access
- Website: http://www.pathwaycommons.org
- Download URL: http://www.pathwaycommons.org/pc2/downloads.html
- Web service URL: http://www.pathwaycommons.org/pc2/
- Sparql endpoint: http://purl.org/pc2/sparql/ http://purl.org/pc2/fct/

Miscellaneous
- License: LGPL 3.0

Pathway Commons is a database of biological pathways and interactions.

== See also ==
- Biological pathway
- Reactome
- WikiPathways
