= Klarisa Rikova =

Klarisa Rikova is a senior scientist at Cell Signaling Technology, Inc. (CST) in Danvers, Massachusetts. She has worked at CST since 2000, and worked as a scientist at CST's sister company, Bluefin Biomedicine in Beverly, Massachusetts, from 2015 to 2019.

== Early life and education ==
Rikova was raised in Tashkent, Uzbekistan. She attended the National University of Uzbekistan where she received her M.Sc. in chemistry. Rikova was hired in 2000 as a scientist at Cell Signaling Technology, Inc. From 2015 to 2019, she worked as a scientist at Bluefin Biomedicine before joining CST once again as a senior scientist.

== Research and career ==
Cell Signaling Technology, Inc. utilized a new form of probability-based mass spectroscopy to analyze post-translational modifications among peptides taken from tumor cell lines. This approach to liquid chromatography-mass spectrometry (LC-MS/MS) included a probability score, or an "Ascore," which measures the probability of a correct phosphorylation site by measuring the presence of specific ions indicative of phosphorylation sites on a peptide sequence. Using this method, scientists at Cell Signaling Technology were able to generate pY antibodies that function to pull down phosphorylated tyrosine residues through immunoprecipitation.

Rikova utilized this phosphoproteomic technique with tissue samples from patients with non-small cell lung cancer (NSCLC) and found excess phosphorylation in the tumor cell lines and surveyed tyrosine kinase signaling in these cancer lines. Tyrosine kinase receptors present putative diagnostic targets as they are themselves phosphorylated at tyrosine residues upon activation, thereby indicating the receptor is active. Analyzing NSCLC tissue samples identified oncogenic tyrosine kinases based on their phosphorylation profile and identified the novel ALK and ROS fusion proteins in NSCLC. To determine the genetic profile of these proteins, Rikova performed RT-PCR and discovered ALK to be fused to EML4, a microtubule protein, triggering perpetual activation of the ALK tyrosine kinase. She proposed that a coiled-coil domain fused to the kinase domain of ALK is likely to permit oligomerization and consequently, constitutive activation of ALK kinase in these cancer types. Similarly, the ROS tyrosine kinase was determined to be fused to SLC34A2, a transmembrane carrier protein, such that the N-terminal domain of SLC34A2 is fused to the transmembrane domain in ROS, also found to have constitutive activation.

Focusing on cell signaling and post-transcriptional modifications (PTMs) enabled this novel screening technique that identifies specific oncogenic mutations in patients.

== Most-cited publications ==
- Rikova K, Guo A, Zeng Q, Possemato A, Yu J, Haack H, Nardone J, Lee K, Reeves C, Li Y, Hu Y. Global survey of phosphotyrosine signaling identifies oncogenic kinases in lung cancer. Cell. 2007 Dec 14;131(6):1190-203. (open access) (Cited 2443times, according to Google Scholar)
- Guo A, Villén J, Kornhauser J, Lee KA, Stokes MP, Rikova K, Possemato A, Nardone J, Innocenti G, Wetzel R, Wang Y. Signaling networks assembled by oncogenic EGFR and c-Met. Proceedings of the National Academy of Sciences. 2008 Jan 15;105(2):692-7. (open access) (Cited 563 times, according to Google Scholar.)
- Carretero J, Shimamura T, Rikova K, Jackson AL, Wilkerson MD, Borgman CL, Buttarazzi MS, Sanofsky BA, McNamara KL, Brandstetter KA, Walton ZE. Integrative genomic and proteomic analyses identify targets for Lkb1-deficient metastatic lung tumors. Cancer cell. 2010 Jun 15;17(6):547-59. (open access) (Cited 235 times, according to Google Scholar.)
