= LIPID MAPS =

Content
- Description: Lipidomics

Contact
- Primary citation: PMID 17584797
- Release date: 2003

Access
- Website: www.lipidmaps.org
- Download URL: https://lipidmaps.org/resources/data
- Sparql endpoint: https://lipidmaps.org/sparql

LIPID MAPS (Lipid Metabolites and Pathways Strategy) is a web portal designed to be a gateway to Lipidomics resources. The resource has spearheaded a classification of biological lipids, dividing them into eight general categories. LIPID MAPS provides standardised methodologies for mass spectrometry analysis of lipids, e.g.

LIPID MAPS has been cited as evidence of a growing appreciation of the study of lipid metabolism and the rapid development and standardisation of the lipidomics field

Key LIPID MAPS resources include:

- LIPID MAPS Structure Database (LMSD) - a database of structures and annotations of biologically relevant lipids, containing over 50000 different lipids. The paper describing this resource has, according to PubMed, been cited more than 200 times.
- LIPID MAPS In-Silico Structure Database (LMISSD) - a database of computationally predicted lipids generated by expansion of headgroups for commonly occurring lipid classes
- LIPID MAPS Gene/Proteome Database (LMPD) - a database of genes and gene products which are involved in lipid metabolism

Tools available from LIPID MAPS enable scientists to identify likely lipids in their samples from mass spectrometry data, a common method to analyse lipids in biological specimens. In particular, LipidFinder enables analysis of MS data. Tutorials and educational material on lipids are also available at the site.

In January 2020, LIPID MAPS became an ELIXIR service. and in 2024 a core data resource. In addition, it joined Global Biodata Coalition as a core biodata resource.

== History ==
LIPID MAPS was founded in 2003 with NIH funding. LIPID MAPS was previously funded by a multi-institutional grant from Wellcome, and is now funded under an MRC Partnership award, held jointly by University of Cardiff led by Prof Valerie O'Donnell, the Babraham Institute, UCSD and Swansea University, and The University of Edinburgh. Wakelam's obituary describes LIPID MAPS as unifying the field of lipidomics.

LIPID MAPS is sponsored by Cayman Chemical and Avanti Polar lipids
