= Signaling Gateway (website) =

Web Portal

Signaling Gateway is a web portal dedicated to signaling pathways powered by the San Diego Supercomputer Center at the University of California, San Diego. It was initiated by a collaboration between the Alliance for Cellular Signaling and Nature. A primary feature is the Molecule Pages database.

== Molecule Pages Database (online database journal) ==
Signaling Gateway Molecule Pages is a database containing "essential information on more than 8000 mammalian proteins (Mouse and Human) involved in cellular signaling."

The content of molecule pages is authored by invited experts and is peer-reviewed. The published pages are citable by digital object identifiers (DOIs). All data in the Molecule Pages are freely available to the public.

Data can be exported to PDF, XML, BioPAX/SBPAX and SBML.

MIRIAM Registry Details.

== Some Published Molecule Pages ==
- Robitaille, Aaron; Hall, Michael (2008). "MTOR". AfCS-Nature Molecule Pages. doi:10.1038/mp.a000094.01.
- Takemaru, Ken-Ichi (2006). "Catenin, beta". AfCS-Nature Molecule Pages. doi:10.1038/mp.a000506.01.
- Rousseau, Simon (2011). "P38 alpha MAP kinase". AfCS-Nature Molecule Pages. doi:10.1038/mp.a001717.01.
- Katoh, Masaru (2008). "Frizzled 7". AfCS-Nature Molecule Pages. doi:10.1038/mp.a000965.01.
