= Comparative Toxicogenomics Database =

Comparative Toxicogenomics Database (CTD)
- Developer(s): Department of Biological Sciences at North Carolina State University and the Department of Bioinformatics, MDI Biological Laboratory
- Initial release: 12 November 2004; 20 years ago
- Available in: English
- Type: Bioinformatics, data analysis
- Website: ctdbase.org

The Comparative Toxicogenomics Database (CTD) is a public website and research tool launched in November 2004 that curates scientific data describing relationships between chemicals/drugs, genes/proteins, diseases, taxa, phenotypes, GO annotations, pathways, and interaction modules. The database is maintained by the Department of Biological Sciences at North Carolina State University.

== Background ==
The Comparative Toxicogenomics Database (CTD) is a public website and research tool that curates scientific data describing relationships between chemicals, genes/proteins, diseases, taxa, phenotypes, GO annotations, pathways, and interaction modules, launched on November 12, 2004. The database is maintained by the Department of Biological Sciences at North Carolina State University.

== Goals and objectives ==
One of the primary goals of CTD is to advance the understanding of the effects of environmental chemicals on human health on the genetic level, a field called toxicogenomics.

The etiology of many chronic diseases involves interactions between environmental factors and genes that modulate important physiological processes. Chemicals are an important component of the environment. Conditions such as asthma, cancer, diabetes, hypertension, immunodeficiency, and Parkinson's disease are known to be influenced by the environment; however, the molecular mechanisms underlying these correlations are not well understood. CTD may help resolve these mechanisms. The most up-to-date extensive list of peer-reviewed scientific articles about CTD is available at their publications page

== Core data ==
CTD is a unique resource where biocurators read the scientific literature and manually curate four types of core data:

- Chemical-gene interactions
- Chemical-disease associations
- Gene-disease associations
- Chemical-phenotype associations

== Data integration ==
By integrating the above four data sets, CTD automatically constructs putative chemical-gene-phenotype-disease networks to illuminate molecular mechanisms underlying environmentally-influenced diseases.

These inferred relationships are statistically scored and ranked and can be used by scientists and computational biologists to generate and verify testable hypotheses about toxicogenomic mechanisms and how they relate to human health.

Users can search CTD to explore scientific data for chemicals, genes, diseases, or interactions between any of these three concepts. Currently, CTD integrates toxicogenomic data for vertebrates and invertebrates.

CTD integrates data from or hyperlinks to these databases:

- ChemIDplus, a dictionary of more than 400,000 chemicals housed in the US National Library of Medicine
- DrugBank
- Data Infrastructure for Chemical Safety project (diXa) Data Warehouse by the European Bioinformatics Institute which as of November 2015 contained 469 compounds, 188 disease datasets in three sub-categories liver, kidney and cardiovascular disease.
- Gene Ontology Consortium
- KEGG
- NCBI Entrez-Gene
- NCBI PubMed
- NCBI Taxonomy
- NLM Medical Subject Headings
- OMIM
- Reactome
