= Cell Signaling Technology =

Medical diagnostic company

Cell Signaling Technology, Inc.
- Company type: Privately held company
- Industry: Life Science, Manufacturing
- Founded: 1999
- Founder: Michael Comb
- Headquarters: Danvers, Massachusetts
- Key people: Michael Comb, President and CEO, Roberto Polakiewicz, CSO, Matthew Curran, CFO, Benjamin Comb, SVP Corporate Strategy, Craig Thompson, VP Global Operations
- Products: Antibodies, ELISA Kits, ChIP Kits, Proteomics kits
- Number of employees: 500 — 550
- Subsidiaries: Cell Signaling Technology Japan, K.K. Cell Signaling Technology (China) Limited; Cell Signaling Technology Europe, B.V.
- Website: www.cellsignal.com

Cell Signaling Technology, Inc. (CST) is a privately held company that develops and produces antibodies, ELISA kits, ChIP kits, proteomic kits, and other related reagents used to study the cell signaling pathways that impact human health. CST maintains an in-house research program, particularly in the area of cancer research, and has published scientific papers in many peer-reviewed journals.

== History ==
Cell Signaling Technology was founded in 1999 by scientists in the Cell Signaling group at New England Biolabs (NEB).

Originally housed in the Cummings Center (Beverly, Massachusetts), CST moved to its current United States headquarters located at the former King’s Grant Inn (Danvers, Massachusetts) in late 2005. Following extensive renovation, the U.S. Green Building Council has certified the current headquarters as a LEED (Leadership in Energy and Environmental Design) certified facility in 2007. In 2008 and 2009, CST expanded its overseas operations, establishing subsidiary offices in the People’s Republic of China, Japan, and the Netherlands.

In 2013, CST moved its production group into an ISO9001 certified facility in Beverly, Massachusetts.

Cell Signaling Technology was named as one of the “Top 100 Places to Work” in a 2009-2013 survey published by the Boston Globe.

== Research ==
In addition to product development and production, CST is also involved in the development of new technologies for signaling analysis as well as mechanistic cell biology research, particularly in the field of cancer research.

CST curates and maintains PhosphoSitePlus, a web-based bioinformatics resource that details post-translational modifications (PTMs) in human, mouse and rat proteins. The types of PTMs curated include phosphorylation, acetylation, methylation, ubiquitylation, glycosylation, etc. This freely accessible, online resource is funded in part through grant support from the NIH, and most recently through the NIH BD2K initiative.

== Notable employees ==
- Klarisa Rikova
