= BioTapestry =

Software application

- Developer: Institute for Systems Biology
- Stable release: 7.1.3 / 25 September 2023
- Written in: Java
- Operating system: Any (Java-based)
- License: LGPL
- Website: BioTapestry home
- Repository: github.com/BioTapestry/Production

BioTapestry is an open source software application for modeling and visualizing gene regulatory networks (GRNs).

== History ==
BioTapestry was created at the Institute of Systems Biology in Seattle, in collaboration with the Davidson Lab at the California Institute of Technology. The project was initiated to support the ongoing development of the model of the GRN regulating the development of the endomesoderm in the sea urchin Strongylocentrotus purpuratus. BioTapestry was initially made public in late 2003 as a web-based, read-only interactive viewer for the sea urchin network, with the first fully functional editor released in August 2004 (v0.94.1). The current version, 7.1.3, was released in September 2023.

== Development ==
Development work on BioTapestry is ongoing. For more information about version 7.1, see the release notes page.

== Usage ==
BioTapestry is an interactive tool for modeling and visualizing gene regulatory networks.

== Interactive examples ==
- Sea urchin endomesoderm network from the Davidson Lab.
- Sea urchin ectoderm network from the Davidson Lab.
- Mouse ventral neural tube specification from the McMahon Lab.
- Environment And Gene Regulatory Influence Network (EGRIN) for Halobacterium salinarum NRC-1 from the Baliga Lab.
- T-cell gene regulatory network from the Rothenberg Lab.
- Zebrafish developmental gene regulatory network from the Yuh Lab.
- Limb Morphogenesis from the Vokes Lab.

== Features ==
Input

- Gene Regulatory Networks can be drawn by hand.
- Networks can be built using lists of interactions entered via dialog boxes.
- Lists of interactions can be input using comma-separated-value (CSV) files.
- Networks can be built using SIF files as input.

Visualization

- BioTapestry uses orthogonal-directed hyperlinks and a hierarchical presentation of models.

Analysis

- BioTapestry can create Systems Biology Markup Language files for a subset of networks.

Documentation

- The BioTapestry home page has links to several tutorials for using the software.

== See also ==
- Gene regulatory network
- Systems biology
