= Systrip =

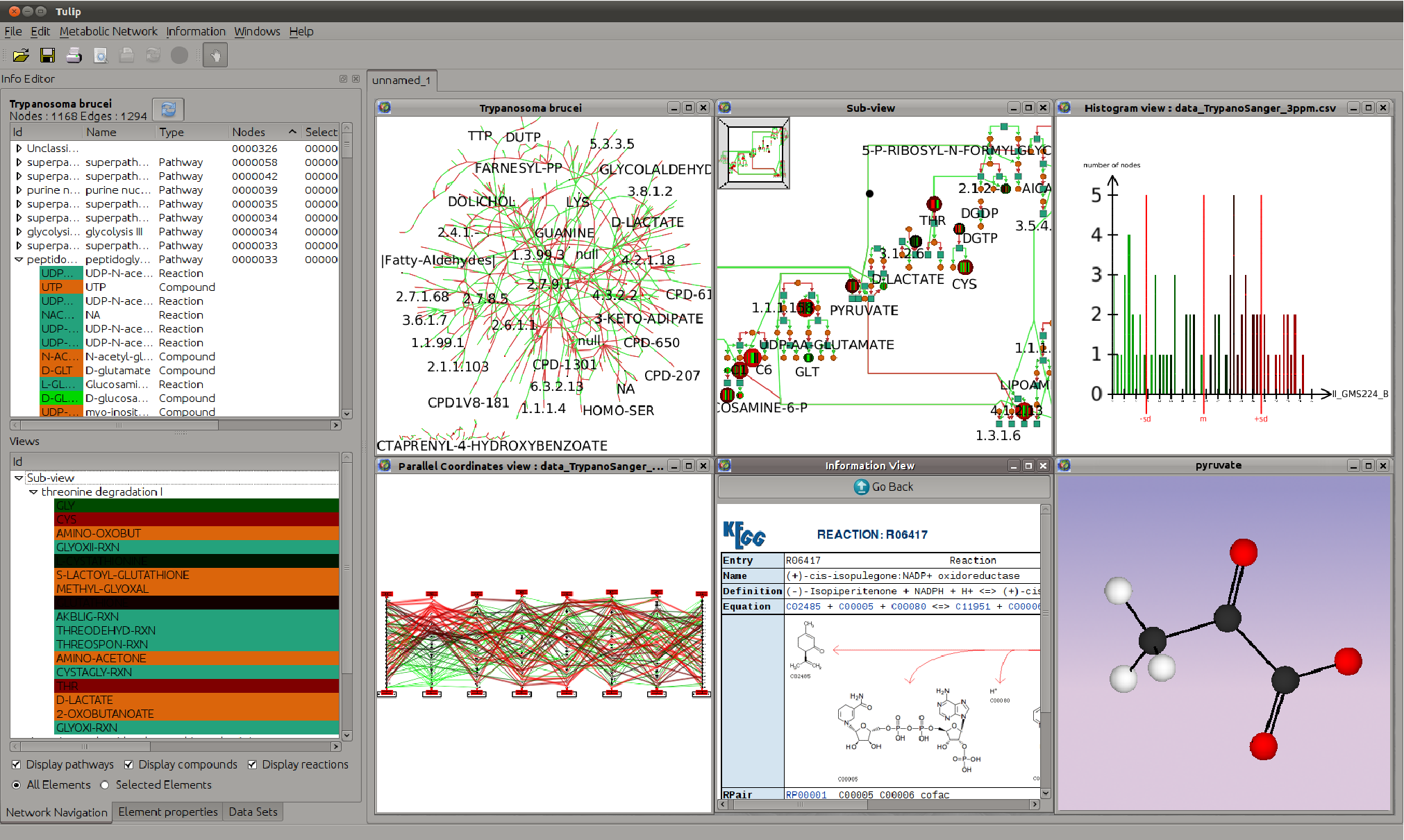
- Stable release: 1.0 / 27 May 2011
- Repository: tulip.labri.fr/Systrip/1.0/files/tulip_3_4_1_with_systrip_1_0.tar.gz
- Operating system: Windows, Linux
- License: LGPL, GPL
- Website: tulip.labri.fr/TulipDrupal/?q=systrip

Systrip is a visual environment for the analysis of time-series data in the context of biological networks. Systrip gathers bioinformatics and graph theoretical algorithms that can be assembled in different ways to help biologists in their visual mining process. It had been used to analyze various real biological data.

== Presentation ==
Systrip is developed in C++ and is based on Tulip, an information visualization framework dedicated to the analysis and visualization of relational data.

The Model-View-Controller architecture of Tulip allows Systrip to support multiple and synchronized views. Any interaction on a view (e.g. selection of an element) implies the automatic update of all views displaying this data. In addition to the algorithms and views developed specifically for Systrip, the Tulip plug-ins system allows Systrip users to access all its available plug-ins (plug-ins integrated in Tulip releases but also via Tulip plug-ins server).

== Features ==
Input

- Import and export metabolic network using the SBML format
- Time-series data from CSV file
- Import data from CSV file
- Load and save state of a session

Structure manipulation

- Pathways creation and removal
- Elements removal
- Sub-network creation and manipulation (Help user to focus on a small part of the network)

Visualization

- Multiple kind of metabolic network representations (3D, force directed, biological convention preserving, hierarchical ...)
- Visualization interaction tools (drawing, bends ...)
- Animation of time-series data
- Visualization of time-series in the context of the metabolic network
- Data analysis views (histogram, spreadsheet, scatter plot, parallel coordinates)
- 3D molecular visualization

Analysis

- Tulip graph analysis algorithms
  - Degree
  - Betweenness centrality
  - Eccentricity
  - Strahler
- Network analysis algorithms
  - Choke points
  - Shortest path (dedicated to metabolic networks)
  - Scope selection
