= MetaCyc =

Metabolic pathways and enzymes database

Content
- Description: Database of metabolic pathways and enzymes

Contact
- Research center: SRI International
- Authors: R. Caspi, H. Foerster, C.A. Fulcher, L.A. Mueller, Peter Karp
- Primary citation: Caspi et al. (2014)
- Release date: 1997

Access
- Website: metacyc.org

The MetaCyc database is one of the largest metabolic pathways and enzymes databases currently available. The data in the database is manually curated from the scientific literature, and covers all domains of life. MetaCyc has extensive information about chemical compounds, reactions, metabolic pathways and enzymes. The data have been curated from more than 58,000 publications.

MetaCyc has been designed for multiple types of uses. It is often used as an extensive online encyclopedia of metabolism. In addition, MetaCyc is used as a reference data set for computationally predicting the metabolic network of organisms from their sequenced genomes; it has been used to perform pathway predictions for thousands of organisms, including those in the BioCyc Database Collection. MetaCyc is also used in metabolic engineering and metabolomics research.

MetaCyc includes mini reviews for pathways and enzymes that provide background information as well as relevant literature references. It also provides extensive data on individual enzymes, describing their subunit structure, cofactors, activators and inhibitors, substrate specificity, and, when available, kinetic constants. MetaCyc data on metabolites includes chemical structures, predicted Standard energy of formation, and links to external databases. Reactions in MetaCyc are presented in a visual display that includes the structures of all components. The reactions are balanced and include EC numbers, reaction direction, predicted atom mappings that describe the correspondence between atoms in the reactant compounds and the product compounds, and computed Gibbs free energy.

All objects in MetaCyc are clickable and provide easy access to related objects. For example, the page for L-lysine lists all of the reactions in which L-lysine participates, as well as the enzymes that catalyze them and pathways in which these reactions take place.
