= Clinical Genome Resource =

The Clinical Genome Resource (ClinGen) is an initiative developed by the National Human Genome Research Institute (NHGRI) with the aim of creating a knowledge base of the clinical relevance of genes and variants for use in precision medicine and research. It was founded by the NHGRI in 2013, and is now funded by the National Institutes of Health (NIH). It is currently developing a resource that aims to define the relevance of genes and variants for utilisation clinically in precision medicine and other research purposes.
