= BioCyc database collection =

BioCyc

Content
- Description: Tools for navigating, visualizing, and analyzing the underlying databases, and for analyzing omics data

Contact
- Research center: SRI International
- Authors: Peter Karp et al
- Release date: 1997

Access
- Website: biocyc.org

The BioCyc database collection is an assortment of organism specific Pathway/Genome Databases (PGDBs) that provide reference to genome and metabolic pathway information for thousands of organisms. As of July 2023, there were over 20,040 databases within BioCyc. SRI International, based in Menlo Park, California, maintains the BioCyc database family.

== Categories of databases ==
Based on the manual curation done, BioCyc database family is divided into 3 tiers:

Tier 1: Databases which have received at least one year of literature based manual curation. Currently there are seven databases in Tier 1. Out of the seven, MetaCyc is a major database that contains almost 2500 metabolic pathways from many organisms. The other important Tier 1 database is HumanCyc which contains around 300 metabolic pathways found in humans. The remaining five databases include, EcoCyc (E. coli), AraCyc (Arabidopsis thaliana), YeastCyc (Saccharomyces cerevisiae), LeishCyc (Leishmania major Friedlin) and TrypanoCyc (Trypanosoma brucei).

Tier 2: Databases that were computationally predicted but have received moderate manual curation (most with 1–4 months curation). Tier 2 Databases are available for manual curation by scientists who are interested in any particular organism. Tier 2 databases currently contain 43 different organism databases.

Tier 3: Databases that were computationally predicted by PathoLogic and received no manual curation. As with Tier 2, Tier 3 databases are also available for curation for interested scientists.

== Software tools ==
The ontological resource contains a variety of software tools for searching, visualizing, comparing, and analyzing genome and pathway information. It includes a genome browser, and browsers for metabolic and regulatory networks. The website also includes tools for painting large-scale ("omics") datasets onto metabolic and regulatory networks, and onto the genome.

== Use in research ==
Since BioCyc Database family comprises a long list of organism specific databases and also data at different systems level in a living system, the usage in research has been in a wide variety of context. Here, two studies are highlighted which show two different varieties of uses, one on a genome scale and other on identifying specific SNPs (Single Nucleotide Polymorphisms) within a genome.

AlgaGEM

AlgaGEM is a genome scale metabolic network model for a compartmentalized algae cell developed by Gomes de Oliveira Dal’Molin et al. based on the Chlamydomonas reinhardtii genome. It has 866 unique ORFs, 1862 metabolites, 2499 gene-enzyme-reaction-association entries, and 1725 unique reactions. One of the Pathway databases used for reconstruction is MetaCyc.

SNPs

The study by Shimul Chowdhury et al. showed association differed between maternal SNPs and metabolites involved in homocysteine, folate, and transsulfuration pathways in cases with congenital heart defects as opposed to controls. The study used HumanCyc to select candidate genes and SNPs.
