= Database of Interacting Proteins =

Database of protein interactions

Database of Interacting Proteins (DIP)

Content
- Description: protein interaction database

Contact
- Research center: University of California, Los Angeles
- Authors: David Eisenberg
- Primary citation: Xenarios, & al. (2002)
- Release date: 2002

Access
- Website: http://dip.doe-mbi.ucla.edu

Miscellaneous
- License: CC BY-ND 3.0

The Database of Interacting Proteins (DIP) is a biological database which catalogs experimentally determined interactions between proteins. It combines information from a variety of sources to create a single, consistent set of protein–protein interactions. The data stored within DIP have been curated, both manually, by expert curators, and automatically, using computational approaches that utilize the knowledge about the protein–protein interaction networks extracted from the most reliable, core subset of the DIP data. The database was initially released in 2002. As of 2014, DIP is curated by the research group of David Eisenberg at UCLA.

DIP can be searched through its web interface; searches may be based on the interactions described in a selected journal article, or interactions supported by experimental evidence, amongst others.

DIP is a member of the International Molecular Exchange Consortium (IMEx), a group of the major public providers of interaction data. Other participating databases include the Biomolecular Interaction Network Database (BIND), IntAct, the Molecular Interaction Database (MINT), MIPS, MPact, and BioGRID. The databases of IMEx work together to prevent duplications of effort, collecting data from non-overlapping sources and sharing the curated interaction data. The IMEx consortium also worked to develop the HUPO-PSI-MI XML format, which is now widely implemented.

All of the information within DIP is freely available under a Creative Commons BY-ND 3.0 license.
