= EcoCyc =

Bioinformatics database for E. coli

Content
- Description: comprehensive database of Escherichia coli biology.
- Organisms: Escherichia coli

Contact
- Research center: SRI International
- Laboratory: SRI International
- Authors: Peter Karp et al
- Primary citation: Keseler & al. (2011)

Access
- Website: ecocyc.org

In bioinformatics, EcoCyc is a biological database for the bacterium Escherichia coli K-12. The EcoCyc project performs literature-based curation of the E. coli genome, and of E. coli transcriptional regulation, transporters, and metabolic pathways. EcoCyc contains written summaries of E. coli genes, distilled from over 36,000 scientific articles. EcoCyc is also a description of the genome and cellular networks of E. coli that supports scientists to carry out computational analyses.

Data objects in the EcoCyc database describe each E. coli gene and gene product. Database objects also describe molecular interactions, including metabolic pathways, transport events, and the regulation of gene expression. EcoCyc provides several genome-scale visualization tools to aid in the analysis of omics data, such as by painting gene expression or metabolomics data onto the full regulatory network of E. coli.

EcoCyc can be accessed through the EcoCyc web site, as a set of downloadable files, and in conjunction with the Pathway Tools software that can be installed locally on Macintosh, PC/Windows, and PC/Linux computers. The downloadable software provides capabilities that go well beyond the web version of EcoCyc.
