= Reactome =

Database of biological pathways

Reactome: a database of reactions, pathways and biological processes.

Content
- Description: Reactome: a database of reactions, pathways and biological processes.

Contact
- Primary citation: PMID 37941124

Access
- Data format: BioPAX; SBML
- Website: https://reactome.org
- Download URL: https://reactome.org/download-data
- Web service URL: https://reactome.org/ContentService/

Miscellaneous
- License: https://reactome.org/license
- Data release frequency: https://reactome.org/about/release-calendar

Reactome is a free online database of biological pathways. It is manually curated and authored by PhD-level biologists, in collaboration with Reactome editorial staff. The content is cross-referenced to many bioinformatics databases. The rationale behind Reactome is to visually represent biological pathways in full mechanistic detail, while making the source data available in a computationally accessible format.

Reactome is maintained by an international multidisciplinary team from OICR, OHSU, EMBL-EBI and NYULMC, with expertise in pathway curation and annotation, software development, and training and outreach, dedicated to providing the research community with openly accessible biological pathway knowledge. The Reactome project is led by Lincoln Stein (OICR). Peter D'Eustachio (NYULMC), Henning Hermjakob (EMBL-EBI), Guanming Wu (OHSU).

The website can be used to browse pathways and submit data to a suite of data analysis tools. The underlying data is fully downloadable in a number of standard formats including PDF, SBML, Neo4j GraphDB, MySQL, PSI-MITAB, and BioPAX. Pathway diagrams use a Process Description (PD) Systems Biology Graphical Notation (SBGN)-based style.

The core unit of the Reactome data model is the reaction. Entities (nucleic acids, proteins, complexes and small molecules) participating in reactions form a network of biological interactions and are grouped into pathways.

The pathways represented in Reactome are species-specific, with each pathway step supported by literature citations that contain an experimental verification of the process represented. If no experimental verification using human reagents exists, pathways may contain steps manually inferred from non-human experimental details, but only if an expert biologist, named as Author of the pathway, and a second biologist, names as Reviewer, agree that this is a valid inference to make. The human pathways are used to computationally generate by an orthology-based process derived pathways in other organisms.

== Database organization ==
Reactome database releases occur quarterly.

In Reactome, human biological processes are annotated by breaking them down into series of molecular events. Like classical chemistry reactions each Reactome event has input physical entities (substrates) which interact, possibly facilitated by enzymes or other molecular catalysts, to generate output physical entities (products).

Reactions include the classical chemical interconversions of intermediary metabolism, binding events, complex formation, transport events that direct molecules between cellular compartments, and events such as the activation of a protein by cleavage of one or more of its peptide bonds. Individual events can be grouped together into pathways.

Physical entities can be small molecules like glucose or ATP, or large molecules like DNA, RNA, and proteins, encoded directly or indirectly in the human genome. Physical entities are cross-referenced to relevant external databases, such as UniProt for proteins and ChEBI for small molecules. Localization of molecules to subcellular compartments is a key feature of the regulation of human biological processes, so molecules in the Reactome database are associated with specific locations. Thus in Reactome instances of the same chemical entity in different locations (e.g., extracellular glucose and cytosolic glucose) are treated as distinct chemical entities.

The Gene Ontology controlled vocabularies are used to describe the subcellular locations of molecules and reactions, molecular functions, and the larger biological processes that a specific reaction is part of.

== Database content ==
The database contains curated annotations that cover a diverse set of topics in molecular and cellular biology.

Reactome invites biological experts as reviewers for completed pathways that are ready for external review. Reviewers will be credited with authorship or reviewership for contributions. Each pathway is associated with a DOI and can be cited as a publication. Reactome contributions in can be easily claimed using the ORCID claiming feature.

== Tools ==
There are tools on the website for viewing an interactive pathway diagram, performing pathway mapping and pathway over-representation analysis and for overlaying expression data onto Reactome pathways. The pathway mapping and over-representation tools take a single column of protein/compound identifiers, Uniprot and ChEBI accessions are preferred but the interface will accept and interpret many other identifiers or symbols. Mixed identifiers can be used. Over-representation results are presented as a list of statistically over-represented pathways.

Expression data is submitted in a multi-column format, the first column identifying the protein, additional columns are expected to be numeric expression values, they can in fact be any numeric value, e.g. differential expression, quantitative proteomics, GWAS scores. The expression data is represented as colouring of the corresponding proteins in pathway diagrams, using the colours of the visible spectrum so 'hot' red colours represent high values. If multiple columns of numeric data are submitted the overlay tool can display them as separate 'experiments', e.g. timepoints or a disease progression.

The database can be browsed and searched as an on-line textbook.

Reactome also has a ReactomeGSA tool, integrated into the Reactome Analysis Tools that allows comparative pathway analyses of multi-omics datasets, with compatibility with single-cell RNA-seq data. Public data from EBI Expression Atlas, Single Cell Expression Atlas, and NCBI GREIN GEO data can be integrated into the analysis.

ReactomeFIViz is a Cytoscape app designed to find pathways and network patterns related to diseases. The app accesses Reactome pathways, perform pathway enrichment analysis for a set of genes, visualize hit pathways, and investigate functional relationships among genes in hit pathways. The app also accesses the Reactome Functional Interaction (FI) network.

== See also ==
- Pathway Commons
- KEGG (The Kyoto Encyclopedia of Genes and Genomes)
- BioCyc database collection
- BRENDA (The BRaunschweig ENzyme DAtabase)
- WikiPathways (which exposes Reactome pathways)
- Comparative Toxicogenomics Database
