= Cytoscape =

Bioinformatics software platform

- Cytoscape home page
- Original author: Institute for Systems Biology
- Developer: Cytoscape Team
- Initial release: July 2002
- Stable release: 3.10.3 / 24 October 2024; 14 months ago
- Repository: github.com/cytoscape/cytoscape
- Written in: Java
- Operating system: Any (Java-based)
- Type: Image processing
- License: LGPL
- Website: www.cytoscape.org

Cytoscape is an open source bioinformatics software platform for visualizing molecular interaction networks and integrating with gene expression profiles and other state data. Additional features are available as plugins. Plugins are available for network and molecular profiling analyses, new layouts, additional file format support and connection with databases and searching in large networks. Plugins may be developed using the Cytoscape open Java software architecture by anyone and plugin community development is encouraged. Cytoscape also has a JavaScript-centric sister project named Cytoscape.js that can be used to analyse and visualise graphs in JavaScript environments, like a browser.

== History ==
Cytoscape was originally created at the Institute of Systems Biology in Seattle in 2002. Now, it is developed by an international consortium of open source developers. Cytoscape was initially made public in July, 2002 (v0.8); the second release (v0.9) was in November, 2002, and v1.0 was released in March 2003. Version 1.1.1 is the last stable release for the 1.0 series. Version 2.0 was initially released in 2004; Cytoscape 2.83, the final 2.xx version, was released in May 2012. Version 3.0 was released Feb 1, 2013, and the latest version, 3.4.0, was released in May 2016.

== Development ==
The Cytoscape core developer team continues to work on this project and released Cytoscape 3.0 in 2013. This represented a major change in the Cytoscape architecture; it is a more modularized, expandable and maintainable version of the software.

== Usage ==
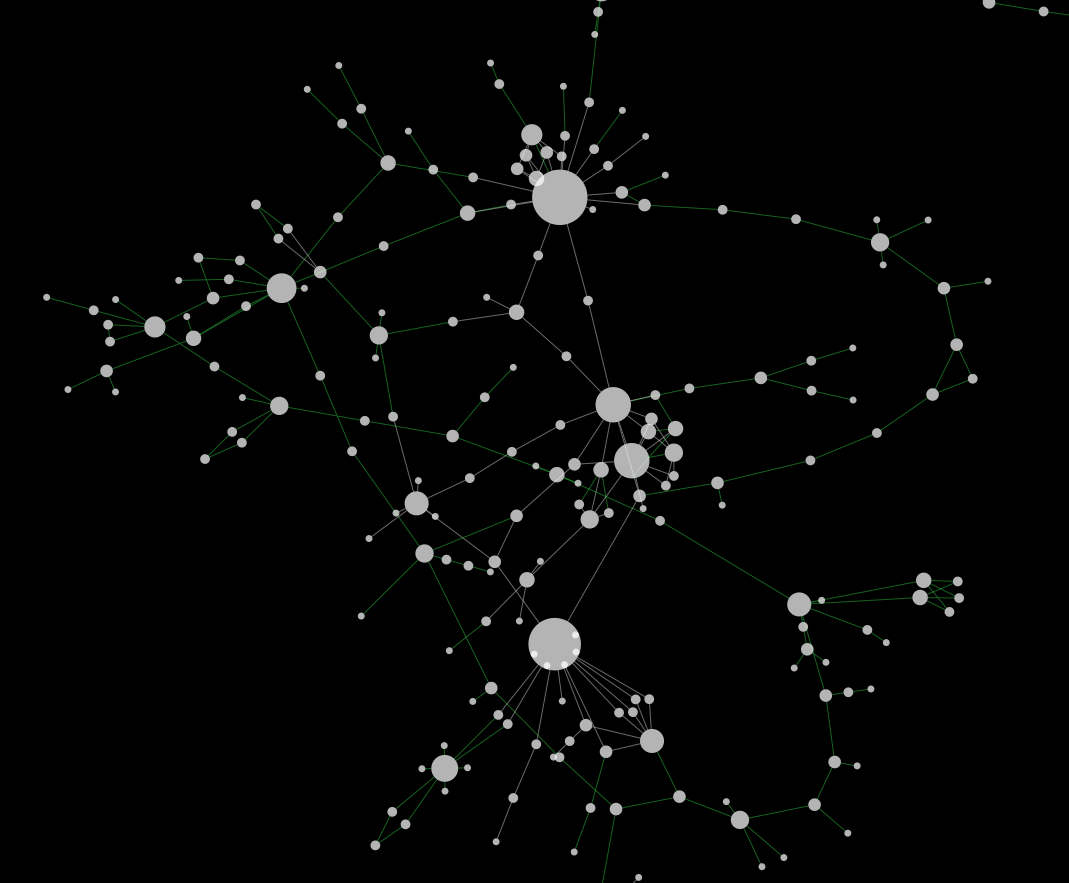
Yeast Protein–protein/Protein–DNA interaction network visualized by Cytoscape. Node degree is mapped to node size

While Cytoscape is most commonly used for biological research applications, it is agnostic in terms of usage. Cytoscape can visualize and analyze network graphs of any kind involving nodes and edges (e.g., social networks). A vital aspect of the software architecture of Cytoscape is the use of plugins for specialized features. Plugins are developed by core developers and the greater user community.

== See also ==
- Computational genomics
- Graph drawing
- JavaScript framework
- JavaScript library
- Metabolic network modelling
- Protein–protein interaction prediction
