= Carole Goble =

British computer scientist (born 1961)

Carole Goble CBE FREng FBCS
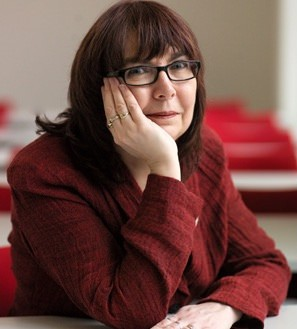
- Born: Carole Anne Goble; 10 April 1961 (age 65)
- Education: Maidstone School for Girls and University of Manchester
- Known for: myGrid; FAIR data; Semantic Grid; Open PHACTS; Apache Taverna; Software Sustainability Institute; The Seven Deadly Sins of Bioinformatics
- Spouse: Ian Cottam (m. 2003)
- Awards: Jim Gray e-Science Award (2008); Karen Spärck Jones lecture (2012)
- Scientific career
- Fields: Semantic web; Bioinformatics; e-Science; Social computing; Workflows
- Workplaces: University of Manchester; Biotechnology and Biological Sciences Research Council
- Academic advisors: Alan Rector; Tom Kilburn
- Website: manchester.ac.uk/research/carole.goble

Carole Anne Goble (born 10 April 1961) is a professor of computer science at the University of Manchester. Goble co-founded the Software Sustainability Institute (SSI) in 2010, serves as joint head of node at the European Strategy Forum on Research Infrastructure (ESFRI) ELIXIR project of the European Union and is a co-author of the influenential FAIR data principles. She previously served as principal investigator (PI) of the myGrid, BioCatalogue and myExperiment projects and co-lead the Information Management Group (IMG) with Norman Paton.

== Education ==
Goble was educated at Maidstone School for Girls, now called Invicta Grammar School. Her academic career has been spent at the Department of Computer Science, where she gained her Bachelor of Science degree in computing and information systems from 1979 to 1982.

== Research and career ==
Goble's research interests include grid computing, the semantic grid, the Semantic Web, ontologies, e-Science, medical informatics, bioinformatics, and Research Objects. She applies advances in knowledge technologies and workflow systems to solve information management problems for life scientists and other scientific disciplines. She has successfully secured funding from the European Union, the Defense Advanced Research Projects Agency (DARPA) in the United States and UK funding agencies including the Engineering and Physical Sciences Research Council (EPSRC), Biotechnology and Biological Sciences Research Council (BBSRC), Economic and Social Research Council (ESRC), Medical Research Council (United Kingdom) (MRC), the Department of Health, the Open Middleware Infrastructure Institute and the Department of Trade and Industry. She is principal investigator (PI) of the myGrid, BioCatalogue and myExperiment projects and co-leads the Information Management Group (IMG) with Norman Paton.

Her work has been published in Nucleic Acids Research, Bioinformatics, IEEE Computer, the Journal of Biomedical Semantics, Briefings in Bioinformatics, Artificial Intelligence in Medicine, the Pacific Symposium on Biocomputing conference, the International Journal of Cooperative Information Systems, the Journal of Biomedical Informatics, Nature Genetics and Drug Discovery Today.

Goble joined the University of Manchester in 1985, and was appointed to a chair in 2000. She is an editorial board member of IEEE Internet Computing, GigaScience, and the International Journal of Web Services Research, and served as the editor-in-chief of Elsevier's Journal of Web Semantics from 2003 to 2008.

Goble serves on the advisory committees of the Science and Technology Facilities Council Physical and Life Sciences advisory committee, the Netherlands Bioinformatics Centre and the European Grid Infrastructure committee. She was appointed to the Biotechnology and Biological Sciences Research Council on 13 June 2013.

Goble has served on the Engineering and Physical Sciences Research Council Technical Opportunities Panel, the Semantic Web Science Association, the British Library's Content Strategy Advisory Board and the Research Councils UK e-Science Steering Committee. She co-founded Cerebra, an early spin-off company to exploit Semantic Web technologies, which has been sold.

=== Awards and honours ===
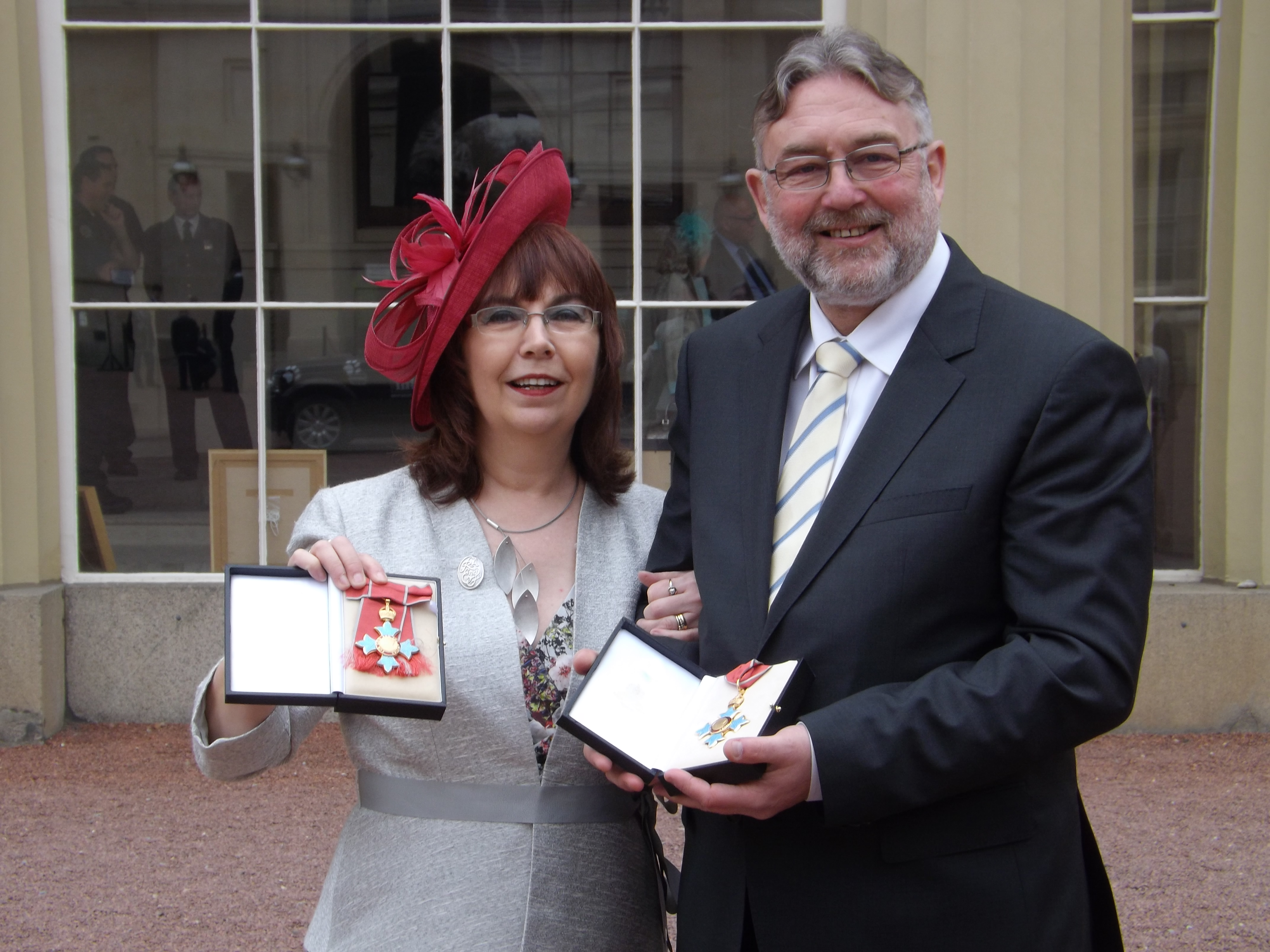
Carole Goble at Buckingham Palace with Douglas Kell after receiving her CBE.

Goble was recipient of the first Jim Gray e-Science Award in December 2008. Tony Hey, corporate vice-president of Microsoft External Research, who sponsored the award, said Goble was chosen for the award because of her work to help scientists do data-intensive science through the Apache Taverna.

Goble won best paper awards at the 3rd IEEE International Conference on e-Science and Grid Computing (2007) and the 11th ACM International Conference on Hypertext. In 2002 she was honoured by Sun Microsystems for her significant achievements in advancing life science computing. She has given keynotes on digital curation, e-social science, grid computing, Intelligent Systems for Molecular Biology, Pacific Symposium on Biocomputing, hypertext and hypermedia, Bioinformatics Open Source Conference (BOSC), artificial intelligence, systems biology, discovery science, the Semantic Web, International World Wide Web Conference and medical informatics.

Goble was appointed Commander of the Order of the British Empire (CBE) in the 2014 New Year Honours for services to science. She was elected a Fellow of the Royal Academy of Engineering (FREng) in 2010. In January 2018 Goble was awarded the degree of Doctorem (honoris causa) by Maastricht University.
