= Trefethen =

Trefethen is a Cornish surname. Notable people with the surname include:

- Anne Trefethen, British computer scientist, former wife of Nick
- Florence Newman Trefethen (1921–2012), American codebreaker, poet, and English professor, wife of Lloyd M. and mother of Nick
- Lloyd M. Trefethen (1919–2001), American fluid dynamics researcher, husband of Florence and father of Nick
- Nick Trefethen (born 1955), British mathematician, son of Florence and Lloyd M., former husband of Anne

== See also ==
- Trefethen Vineyards, a winery in Napa County, California, United States
