= David De Roure =

English computer scientist

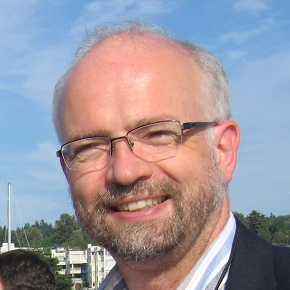
- Born: David Charles De Roure; 3 September 1962 (age 63); North London, England
- Known for: Significant Contributions to e-Research
- Awards: Fellow of the British Computer Society (FBCS)
- Scientific career
- Fields: Digital humanities e-Research; Computational musicology Semantic web Scientific workflow systems
- Institutions: University of Oxford; University of Southampton
- Thesis: A Lisp environment for modelling distributed systems (1990)
- Doctoral advisor: David W. Barron; Peter Henderson
- Website: eng.ox.ac.uk/people/david-de-roure/

David Charles De Roure is an English computer scientist who is a professor of e-Research at the University of Oxford, where he is responsible for Digital Humanities in The Oxford Research Centre in the Humanities (TORCH), and is a Turing Fellow at The Alan Turing Institute. He is a supernumerary Fellow of Wolfson College, Oxford, and Oxford Martin School Senior Alumni Fellow.

From 2009 to 2013 he held the post of National Strategic Director for e-Social Science. and was subsequently a Strategic Advisor to the UK Economic and Social Research Council in the area of new and emerging forms of data and realtime analytics.

He was Director of the Oxford e-Research Centre (OeRC) from 2012 to 2017.

== Early life and education ==
De Roure grew up in West Sussex and studied for an undergraduate degree in mathematics with Physics at the University of Southampton, completing his studies in 1984. He stayed on to do a Doctor of Philosophy degree in 1990 initially under the supervision of David W. Barron and Peter Henderson on a Lisp environment for modelling distributed computing.

== Research and career ==
Following an early career in medical electronics at Sonicaid, De Roure held a longstanding position in the School of Electronics and Computer Science, University of Southampton from its formation as a department in 1986, becoming a full professor in 2000. He was Warden of South Stoneham House in the late 80s. He was closely involved in the UK e-Science programme and is best known for the myExperiment website for sharing scientific workflows and research objects, as well as the Semantic Grid initiative, the UK's Open Middleware Infrastructure Institute (OMII-UK) and its successor, the Software Sustainability Institute. De Roure was the Director of Envisense, the DTI Next Wave Centre for Pervasive Computing in the Environment, from 2003 to 2005. He moved to the Oxford e-Research Centre in July 2010.

In 2009 he was appointed as the National Strategic Director for e-Social Science by the UK Economic and Social Research Council (ESRC) and subsequently held the post of Strategic Advisor in the area of new and emerging forms of data and realtime analytics, leading to the commissioning of projects under phase 3 of the Big Data Network.

His personal research interests include e-Research and Computational musicology and his projects build on Semantic Web, Web 2.0 and Scientific workflow system technologies. A notable contribution to the field of the Semantic Web is his gloss of the common name for the Web Ontology Language, properly 'WOL' and commonly referred to as 'OWL', as deriving from A.A. Milne's character Owl in the Winnie-the-Pooh stories.

Characteristically his work focuses on the 'long tail' of researchers through adoption of user-centric methodologies. He currently works on Social Machines, Digital Humanities, Experimental Humanities, and Internet of Things. De Roure is also Technical Director of the Centre for Practice & Research in Science & Music at the Royal Northern College of Music.

Prior to e-Science he worked on projects such as What's the Score, and in areas such as distributed computing, Amorphous computing, Ubiquitous computing and Hypertext with funding from the Engineering and Physical Sciences Research Council.

== Academic service ==
De Roure was involved in the organisation of Digital Research 2012, FORCE 2015, Web Science 2015, and the Digital Humanities Oxford Summer School series. He was chair of the PETRAS conference “Living in the Internet of Things” in 2018 and 2019.
