= Institute for Research Software =

UK organisation for research software

- Abbreviation: SSI
- Formation: 2010
- Headquarters: EPCC
- Location(s): University of Edinburgh; EPCC; University of Manchester; University of Oxford; University of Southampton
- Director: Neil Chue Hong (2010-present)
- Key people: Malcolm Atkinson (Co-I, 2010-2011); Les Carr (Co-I, 2015-present); David De Roure (Co-I, 2010-2924); Carole Goble (Co-I, 2010-2024); Mark Parsons (Co-I, 2011-2024); David Gavaghan (Chair, 2010-2015); Mark Plumbley (Chair, 2016-2017); Kevin Ashley (Chair, 2018-present); Simon Hettrick (Co-I; Deputy Director, 2014-2024; Director of Strategy, 2024-present); Caroline Jay (Co-I; Director of Research, 2018-present); Selina Aragon (Co-I; Associated Director of Operations, 2024-present)
- Website: www.software.ac.uk

The Institute for Research Software, previously the Software Sustainability Institute is a national facility for building better research software based in the UK and founded in 2010. The Institute is based at the University of Edinburgh (EPCC formerly Edinburgh Parallel Computing Centre) with sites at the University of Manchester, and the University of Southampton. The University of Oxford was a partner site from 2010-2024.

== Organisation ==
Since 2010, the Institute has run for the benefit of researchers and software developers, and funded initially with over £4 million from Engineering and Physical Sciences Research Council (EPSRC). Further funding was provided in 2015 by EPSRC, ESRC and BBSRC, in 2018 by all seven UK research councils, and in 2024 by the UKRI Digital Research Infrastructure programme, with additional project funding from the Joint Information Systems Committee (JISC) and Natural Environment Research Council (NERC).

The principal investigator of the project is Neil Chue Hong with support from co-investigators Simon Hettrick, Caroline Jay and Selina Aragon. Previous Co-Investigators include Malcolm Atkinson, Les Carr, David De Roure, Carole Goble, and Mark Parsons.

== See also ==
- Research software engineering
- Sustainability
- The Karlskrona Manifesto
