= Lloyd Trefethen =

Lloyd Trefethen may refer to:

- Lloyd M. Trefethen (1919-2001), American mechanical engineer
- Lloyd N. Trefethen (born 1955), American mathematician (better known as Nick Trefethen)
