= Alan Rector =

British computer scientist

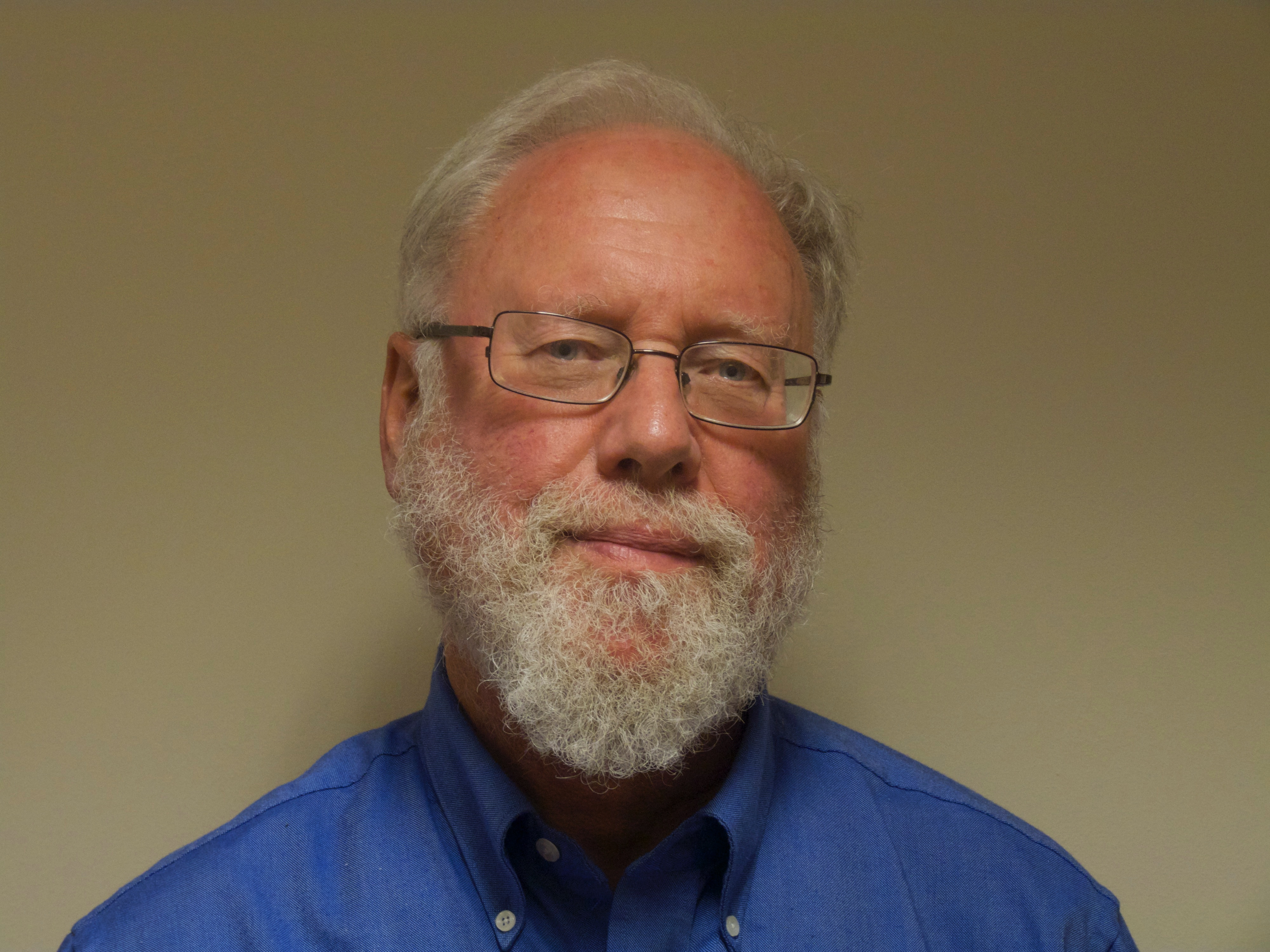
- Born: 30 September 1944
- Known for: Medical Informatics
- Spouse: Peggy Newton
- Awards: 1st British Computer Society award for lifetime service to Health Informatics (2003)
- Scientific career
- Fields: Medical Informatics; Knowledge Representation; OWL
- Workplaces: University of Manchester; Pomona College; University of Minnesota
- Thesis: The knowledge based medical record: a design for decision support in general practice (1987)
- Notable students: Ian Horrocks; Carole Goble
- Website: www.cs.man.ac.uk/~rector

Alan L. Rector is a retired professor (emeritus) of medical informatics in the Department of Computer Science at the University of Manchester in the UK.

== Education ==
Rector received a Bachelor of Arts degree from Pomona College in 1966, a Doctor of Medicine (MD) degree from the University of Minnesota in 1972 and a PhD from the University of Manchester in 1987.

== Research ==
Rector's research specialty was clinical terminology, SNOMED, GRAIL, OpenGALEN, biomedical ontologies, Artificial Intelligence in medicine, the Web Ontology Language and the development of the semantic web. He led the CO-ODE and HyOntUse projects developing user-oriented ontology development environments under the JISC and EPSRC Semantic Web and Autonomic Computing initiatives as well as the CLEF project, developing secure and ethical methods to collect live patient record data, under the MRC eScience initiative.

Rector was a visiting senior scientist at Stanford University. He provided consultancy to the NHS Information Authority, the Mayo Clinic & Hewlett-Packard and Siemens Healthcare. He was a member of the Jisc Committee for the Support of Research, the National Cancer Research Institute Board for Bioinformatics, the Joint NHS/Higher Education Forum on Informatics, and the Board of the Academic Forum of the UK Institute for Health Informatics. Rector also served on the board of HL7-UK, the main standards body for Healthcare Informatics and was involved with the International World Wide Web Conference and the World Wide Web Consortium (W3C).

His research was funded by the Engineering and Physical Sciences Research Council, the Medical Research Council and the Joint Information Systems Committee.

== Awards ==
In 2003, he received the 1st British Computer Society Health Informatics Committee award for lifetime service to Health Informatics.

== Personal ==
Rector reached retirement age in September 2011 but remained active in the field until 2019. His wife Peggy Newton died on 3 January 2024.
