= ECSP =

ECSP may refer to:

- EC-Council Certified Secure Programmer, professional information security certification provided by EC-Council
- European Crowdfunding Service Provider, a legal entity according to the Proposal for a European Crowdfunding Service Provider Regulation, COM(2018)113
- Edinburgh Concurrent Supercomputer Project, a project formed to manage the Edinburgh Concurrent Supercomputer
- Environmental Change and Security Program, a program at the Woodrow Wilson International Center for Scholars
