= XT6 =

XT6 may refer to:

- Cray XT6, an updated version of the Cray XT5 supercomputer
- Cadillac XT6, a luxury automobile
- Subaru XT6, a six-cylinder version of the Subaru XT automobile
