= Enhanced publication =

Enhanced publications or enhanced ebooks are a form of electronic publishing for the dissemination and sharing of research outcomes, whose first formal definition can be tracked back to 2009. As many forms of digital publications, they typically feature a unique identifier (possibly a persistent identifier) and descriptive metadata information. Unlike traditional digital publications (e.g. PDF article), enhanced publications are often tailored to serve specific scientific domains and are generally constituted by a set of interconnected parts corresponding to research assets of several kinds (e.g. datasets, videos, images, stylesheets, services, workflows, databases, presentations) and to textual descriptions of the research (e.g. papers, chapters, sections, tables). The nature and format of such parts and of the relationships between them, depends on the application domain and may largely vary from case to case.

The main motivations behind enhanced publications are to be found in the limitations of traditional scientific literature to describe the whole context and outcome of a research activity. Their goal is to move "beyond the simple PDF" (FORCE11 initiative) and support scientists with advanced ICT tools for sharing their research more comprehensively, without losing the narrative spirit of "the publication" as dissemination means. This trend is confirmed by the several enhanced publication systems devised in the literature, offering to research communities one or more of the following functionalities: Packaging of related research assets; Web 2.0 reading capabilities; Interlinking research outputs; Re-production and assessment of scientific experiments.

== Packaging of related research assets ==
The first enhancement introduced to move beyond the mare digitization of the publication and investigate new avenues in the digital scholarly communication was likely accompanying a digital publication (e.g. PDF file) with supplementary material. In such scenarios, scientists can share packages consisting of publication and supplementary material in an attempt to better deliver hypothesis and results of the research presented in the publication.

Enhanced publication system	References
ReadCube Enhanced PDF	ReadCube Papers Supplementary viewing options, Wiley Journals: What is ReadCube
Journals with supplementary material policies	Elsevier Supplementary Data policies, SAGE Journals: Author Guide to Supplementary Files
Modular Article	Kircz, Joost G. (2002)
LORE	Gerber, A., & Hunter, J. (2010)

== Web 2.0 reading capabilities ==
This category of approaches focuses on enhanced publication data models whose parts, metadata and relationships are defined with the purpose of improving the end-user experience when visualizing and discovering research materials. These approaches are the natural extension of the traditional publication, oriented to reading, and typically integrate all tools made available by the web infrastructure and its data sources.

Specifically, they explore the possibilities of:

- structuring narrative text into interconnected sub-parts
- re-using the universe of web resources to enrich the text
- including dynamic forms of content within the text

Enhanced publication system	References
ReadCube Enhanced PDF	Wiley Journals: What is ReadCube
D4Science Live documents	Candela, L., Castelli, D., Pagano P., & Simi, M. (2005)
SciVee	Fink & Bourne (2007)
PLOS Neglected Tropical Diseases	Shotton, Portwin, Klyne, & Miles (2009)
The Veteran Tapes Project	van den Heuvel, van Horik, Sanders, Scagliola, & Witkamp (2010)
Utopia Documents	Attwood, T. K., Kell, D. B., McDermott, P., Marsh, J., Pettifer, S. R., & Thorne, D. (2010)
Rich Internet Publications	Breure, Voorbij, & Hoogerwerf (2011)
SOLE	Pham, Malik, Foster, Di Lauro, & Montella (2012)
Elsevier's Article of the Future	Aalbersberg, I. J., Heeman, F., Koers, H., & Zudilova-Seinstra, E. (2012)
Bookshelf	Hoeppner (2013)

== Interlinking research outputs ==
Scientific communities, organizations, and funding agencies supports initiatives, standards and best practices for publishing and citing datasets and publications on the web. Examples are DataCite, EPIC and CrossRef, which establish common best practices to assign metadata information and persistent identifiers to datasets and publications. Data publishing and citation practices are advocated by research communities that believe that datasets should be discoverable and reusable in order to improve the scientific activity. On this respect, several enhanced publication information systems were built to offer the possibility to enrich a publication with links to relevant research data, possibly deposited in data repositories or discipline specific databases. The existence of links between literature and data support the discovery of used and produced scientific data, strengthen data citation, facilitate data re-use, and reward the precious work underlying data management procedures.

Enhanced publication system	References
ReadCube Enhanced PDF	Fenton (2016)
SCOPE	Cheung, Hunter, Lashtabeg, & Drennan (2008)
CENS ORE Aggregations	Pepe, Mayernik, Borgman and Van de Sompel (2009)
europePMC	McEntyre et al. (2011)
WormBase	Yook et al. (2012)
DANS Enhanced Publication Project	Farace, Frantzen, Stock, Sesink, & Rabina (2012)
BioTea	Garcia et al. (2013)

== Re-production and assessment of scientific experiments ==
Scientists should be equipped with the facilities necessary to repeat or reproduce somebody else's experiment. In enhanced publications with executable parts, narrative parts are accompanied by executable workflows with the purpose of reproducing and repeating experiments.

Enhanced publication system	References
Scientific Model Packages	Hunter (2006a), Hunter (2006b), Hunter & Cheung (2007)
MyExperiment (Research Objects)	De Roure et al. (2009); Bechhofer, Soure, Gamble, Goble, & Buchan (2010)
IODA	Siciarek and Wiszniewski (2011)
Paper Mâché	Brammer, Crosby, Matthews, & Williams (2011)
Collage Authoring Environment	Nowakowski et al. (2011)
SciCrunch's RRIDs	Jeffrey et al. (2014)
SHARE	Van Gorp & Mazanek (2011)
