= MyExperiment =

myExperiment
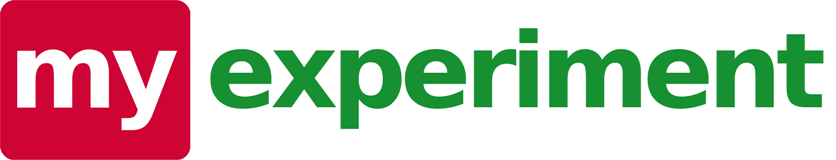

Content
- Description: myExperiment

Contact
- Research center: Department of Computer Science, University of Manchester
- Primary citation: Goble & al. (2010)

Access
- Website: http://www.myexperiment.org

myExperiment is a social web site for researchers sharing research objects such as scientific workflows.

The myExperiment website was launched in November 2007 and contains a significant collection of scientific workflows for a variety of workflow systems, most notably Taverna, but also other tools such as Bioclipse. myExperiment has a REST API and is based on an open source Ruby on Rails codebase. It supports Linked data and had a SPARQL Endpoint, with an interactive tutorial.

== Origin ==
The myExperiment project was initially directed by David De Roure at University of Southampton (later University of Oxford) and was one of the activities of the myGrid consortium led by Carole Goble of The University of Manchester, UK and of the e-Research South UK regional consortium led by the Oxford e-Research Centre. It was originally funded by Jisc under the Virtual Research Environment programme and by the Microsoft Technical Computing Initiative.

== Capturing digital experiments ==
While the initial idea of myExperiment may have been to capture computational experiments as executions of registered workflows (submitted to a configured workflow runner API), in reality most users of myExperiment shared only workflow definitions, possibly with example files.

== Influence on Research Objects development ==
The myExperiment Ontology included details of social networking, attributions, experiments and workflow structures. This work was instrumental in forming the idea of Research Objects, a Linked Data method for identification, aggregation and exchange of scholarly information. In the myExperiment Ontology, the Research Object was loosely represented as a "Pack" of typed related resources, including workflows.

myExperiment was since enhanced by the Workflows Forever project (Wf4Ever) which in 2011 aimed to provide new features to support the preservation of Research Objects in conjunction with the dLibra digital library framework.

The Wf4Ever co-development with the workflow system Taverna (at the time maintained by myGrid), led to the creation of the Research Object Model ontologies. RO Model uses many of the conceptual ideas of the myExperiment Ontology, but with a basis of an OAI-ORE aggregation as the central digital object, and with a primary goal of reproducibility and integration with the W3C provenance model PROV, the replacing RO Model was independent of the social network at a workflow registry.

In 2019, subsequent development of Research Object Crate (RO-Crate) replaced the RO Model with a profile of schema.org serialised in JSON-LD, this was general purpose for scholarly outputs. This ontology-less approach was better suitable for packaging in a ZIP archive and aimed to be more approachable for developers without Linked Data experience.

== Current status ==
The myexperiment.org is as of 2024 hosted by University of Manchester, at professor Carole Goble's eScience Lab as a legacy service.

The research group has since launched myExperiment's replacement, the workflow registry workflowhub.eu, which uses a profile of RO-Crate for publishing workflows together with their context and dependencies. In contrast with myExperiment, the WorkflowHub however do not focus on the social network aspects (beyond institutional/project organisation of entries), and do not attempt to capture any experiments.
