= Mike Papazoglou =

Australian academic

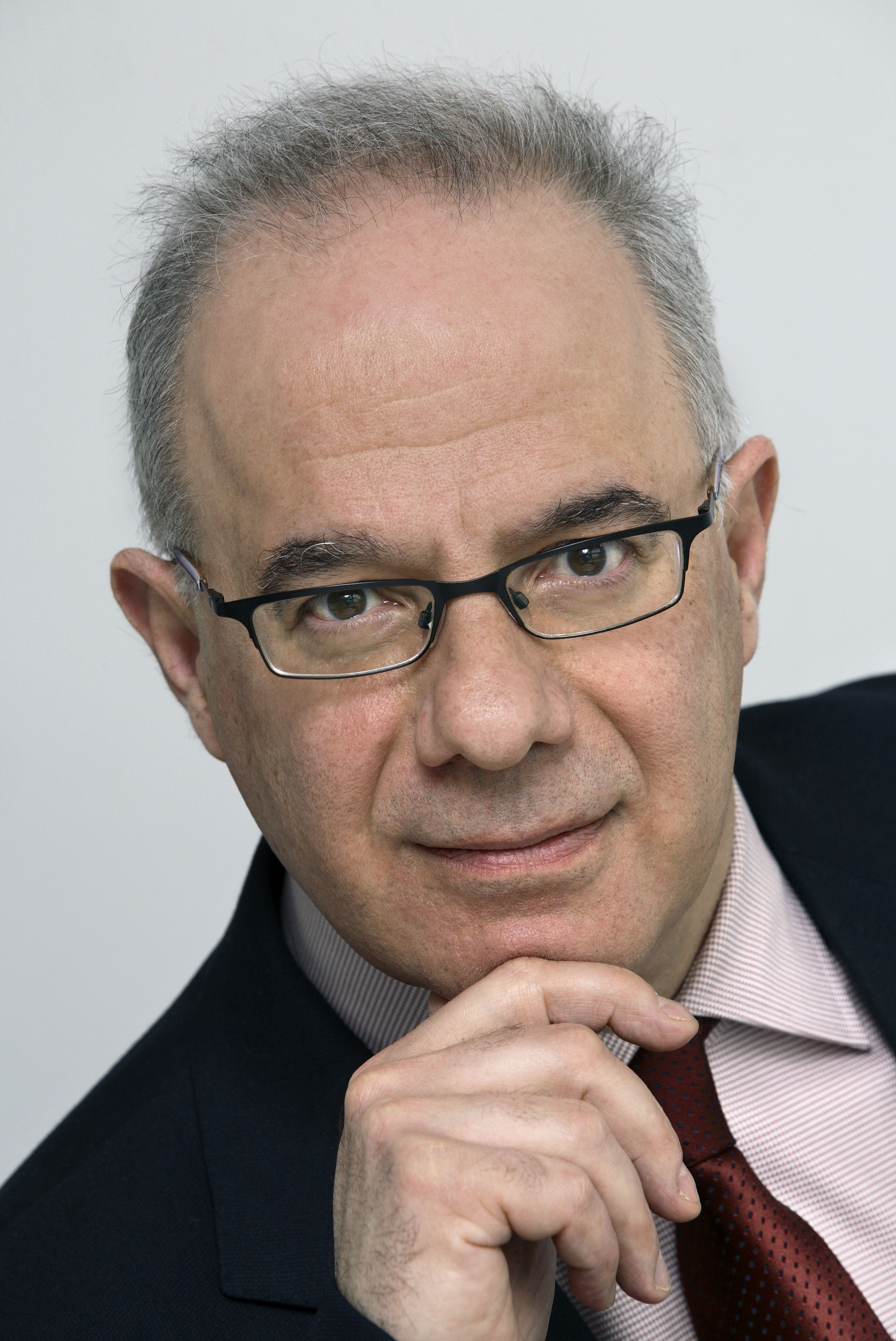
Mike Papazoglou in 2008

Michael (Mike) Papazoglou (born December 2, 1953) is a Greek/Australian emeritus professor, computer science researcher and author known for his contributions to 'Service-Oriented Computing'.

His main research interests include Distributed computing, Database#Database management system, Big data, Service (systems architecture), Domain-specific language and Cloud computing. In more recent years he shifted his focus to pursuing Emerging technologies, Industrial engineering, Smart Applications and Smart Technology Solutions for Healthcare and Manufacturing.

== Education and Academic Career ==
Papazoglou obtained his Bachelor of Science in Electronic Engineering, with honors in Electronic Engineering in 1978, from the University of Dundee, and his MSc and Ph.D in Computer Systems Engineering from the University of Edinburgh and University of Dundee, in 1979 and 1983, respectively. He is an Alexander S. Onassis Foundation scholarship recipient for his Ph.D studies.

During his early career, Papazoglou served as Principal Researcher and Project Leader at the National German Society for Mathematics and Data Processing (Gesellschaft für Mathematik und Datenverarbeitung, GMD, which is now part of Fraunhofer Society) and as an adjunct professor at the University of Koblenz and Landau. He then joined the Australian National University, in Canberra, Australia as a Senior Lecturer and subsequently as a Reader in Computer Science. Following this, he became a Full Professor & Head of the Information Systems School at the Queensland University of Technology, in Brisbane. From 1996 until March 2020 he held the Chair of Computer Science at Tilburg University, where he was the founder and the Executive Director of the European Research Institute in Services Science (ERISS). He is an Emeritus Professor at Tilburg University.

== Research ==
Papazoglou early work was in Parallel computing, Federated database system, Database design Methodologies, Semantic data model and Cooperative Systems where he published extensively. He subsequently, expanded his work in the area of e-Business Integration where he published a widely used textbook, and, Business Process Compliance From the late 90s he focused his research work in the areas of Service Oriented Computing, Cloud Computing,Smart manufacturing and Digital health.

Papazoglou developed theories, principles, and methods applied to software services research and published the very first textbook on Web Services In more recent years, he focused his work in pursuing Emerging Technologies, Smart Applications and Smart Technology Solutions for Manufacturing, and Smart Healthcare. In Smart Manufacturing he made contributions to product engineering, product lifecycle management, smart manufacturing networks, while in Smart Healthcare he made contributions to Big Data and AI technologies for Digital Healthcare and Medical Digital Twins.

Finally, he set up mechanisms for achieving a common vision of 'strategic software service research domains' and associated research road-maps by co-foundling and serving as the scientific director of the European Network of Excellence in Software Systems and Services (S-Cube), which was funded by the European Union's Framework Programmes for Research and Technological Development and comprised 20 core EU research institutes and several associate partners spread over Europe.

== Recognition ==
Papazoglou is a co-founding editor of the MIT Press Book Series in Information Systems and for the Springer Science+Business Media Book Series in Service Science. He has chaired well-known international conferences in his topics of interest including the International Conference on Distributed Computing Systems ICDCS-98, the International Conference on Data Engineering ICDE 1999, the International Conference on Service Oriented Computing, ICSOC 2003, the International Conference on Web Information Systems Engineering WISE 2004 and others. In 2021 he was presented with the Albert Nelson Marquis Lifetime Achievement Award for having excelled in his field of expertise for over 20 years.

== Other Academic Achievements ==
Papazoglou is the founder and advisory editor of the International Journal of Cooperative Information Systems and a co-founder of the International Conferences on Cooperative Information Systems and the International Conference on Service Oriented Computing. He is also a co-founder and vice President of the Scientific Academy for Service Technology (ServTech)
