= Susanna-Assunta Sansone =

British-Italian data scientist

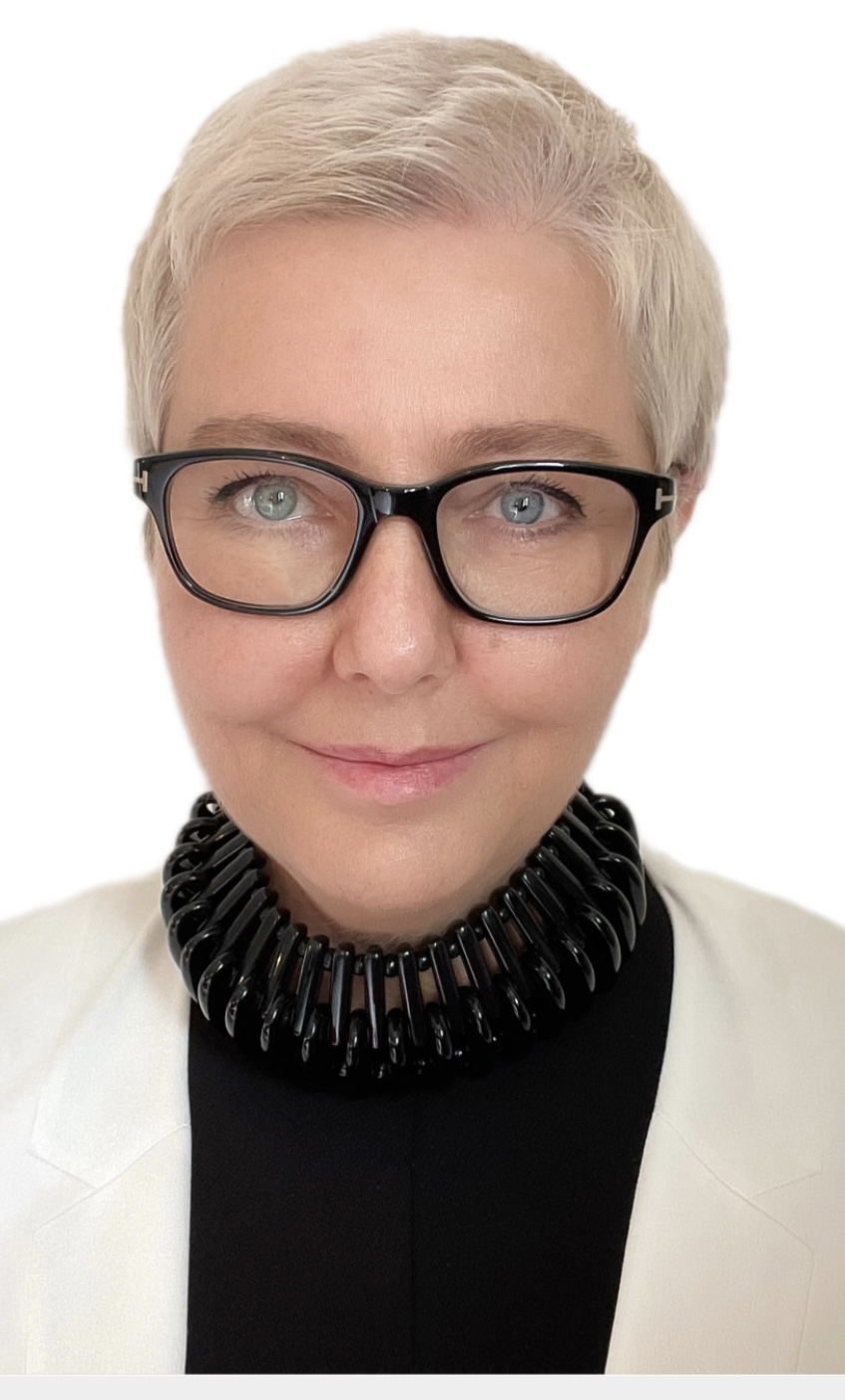
- Susanna-Assunta Sansone
- Other name: FAIR lady
- Education: University of Naples Federico II; Imperial College London (BSc, PhD)
- Scientific career
- Fields: Open science Reproducibility; Data management Data publication FAIR data
- Workplaces: University of Oxford; Oxford e-Research Centre; European Bioinformatics Institute; Research Data Alliance; Microscience Ltd
- Thesis: The role of CU-ZN-cofactored superoxide dismutase in salmonella virulence (2001)
- Website: eng.ox.ac.uk/people/susanna-assunta-sansone/

Susanna-Assunta Sansone is a British-Italian data scientist who is professor of data readiness at the University of Oxford where she leads the data readiness group and serves as associate director of the Oxford e-Research Centre. Her research investigates techniques for improving the interoperability, reproducibility and integrity of data.

== Early life and education ==
Sansone is from Italy. She was an undergraduate student at the University of Naples Federico II. She earned her bachelor's degree in molecular biology and a PhD in microbiology at Imperial College London, where she worked in St Mary's Hospital, London. Her thesis investigated the role of the cofactored enzyme superoxide dismutase in the virulence of Salmonella.

== Research and career ==
After earning her doctorate, she moved to Microscience Ltd, where she characterised vaccine strains. In 2001, Sansone joined the European Bioinformatics Institute (EBI), part of the European Molecular Biology Laboratory (EMBL) where she worked in research data management. Sansone joined the University of Oxford in 2010. She became concerned that whilst there were vast amounts of data in the public domain, the majority of it was not reusable. To make data reusable, Sansone encourages researchers to combine their data with metadata: a description of what the data means. Sansone has described data reproducibility as “the foundation of every scientific field,”.

Sansone's research investigates strategies to enable the creation of research objects that are Findable, Accessible, Interoperable and Reusable (FAIR). She co-founded the peer-reviewed journal Scientific Data in 2013, and serves as chair of the Research Data Alliance. She co-authored the FAIR data principles in 2016, a set of guidelines for the scientific ecosystem. FAIR principles have since been adopted by funding bodies, scientific publishers and the private sector. Sansone works with partners to deliver data stewardship and data governance training and to develop guidelines to make data more accessible. She is one of the co-creators the FAIR Cookbook, an online resource for life scientists to enable them to keep FAIR data. Her research has been funded by the Biotechnology and Biological Sciences Research Council (BBSRC) and the European Union.

=== Selected publications ===
Her publications include

- The FAIR Guiding Principles for scientific data management and stewardship
- ArrayExpress--a public database of microarray experiments and gene expression profiles
- The OBO Foundry: coordinated evolution of ontologies to support biomedical data integration
- The minimum information about a genome sequence (MIGS) specification
- MetaboLights—an open-access general-purpose repository for metabolomics studies and associated meta-data
- COVID-19 pandemic reveals the peril of ignoring metadata standards
- ISA software suite: supporting standards-compliant experimental annotation and enabling curation at the community level
- Toward interoperable bioscience data
- Modeling biomedical experimental processes with OBI
