= Mark Embree =

American mathematician

- Education: University of Oxford; Virginia Tech
- Known for: Krylov subspace methods, non-normal operators and spectral perturbation theory, Toeplitz matrices, random matrices, and damped wave operators
- Awards: Man of the Year and Outstanding Student in the College of Arts and Sciences at Virginia Tech (1996); Rhodes Scholar (1996)
- Scientific career
- Fields: Mathematician
- Workplaces: Rice University
- Doctoral advisor: Andrew Wathen
- Website: http://www.math.vt.edu/people/embree/

Mark Embree is professor of computational and applied mathematics at Virginia Tech in Blacksburg, Virginia. Until 2013, he was a professor of computational and applied mathematics at Rice University in Houston, Texas.

Mark Embree was awarded Man of the Year and Outstanding Student in the College of Arts and Sciences at Virginia Tech in 1996. He was also a Rhodes Scholar at the University of Oxford, where he completed his doctorate.

== Early life ==
Mark Embree attended Thomas Jefferson High School for Science and Technology.

== Research ==
His main research interests are Krylov subspace methods, non-normal operators and spectral perturbation theory, Toeplitz matrices, random matrices, and damped wave operators.

=== Books ===
Embree wrote a book with Lloyd N. Trefethen titled Spectra and Pseudospectra: The Behavior of Nonnormal Matrices and Operators.

== See also ==
- Embree–Trefethen constant
