= Clinical terminology server =

A clinical terminology server is a terminology server, which contains and provides access to clinical terminology.

== Background ==
The first generic description of general terminology servers per se was produced by the European GALEN Project. Rector et al. outline the functional attributes of the GALEN terminology server.

A clinical terminology server provides the following services to client applications:

- management of external references
- management of internal representations
- mapping natural language to concepts and vv
- mapping concepts to medical classification schemes
- management of extrinsic information

The main purpose of a clinical terminology server is to allow the consistent and comparable entry of clinical data, e.g. patient observations, findings and events.
