= HPCx =

UK-based supercomputer

Coordinates: 53°20′35″N 02°38′26″W

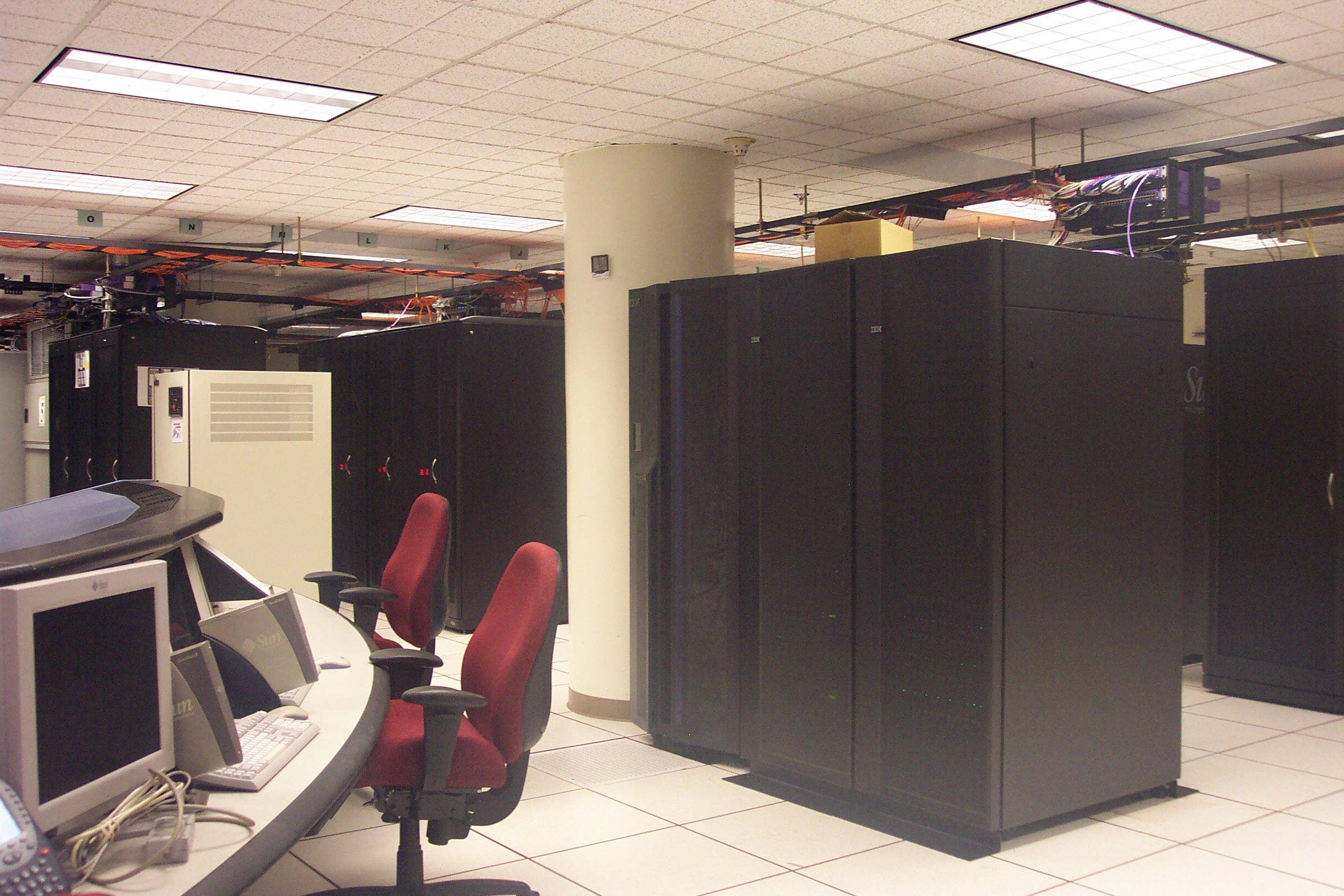
- IBM eServer p5 575 computer cluster, of the type used in HPCx
- Active: December 2002 – January 2010
- Sponsors: EPSRC
- Operators: Partners including EPCC, STFC and NAG)
- Location: University of Edinburgh, Scotland, United Kingdom
- Operating system: Cray Linux Environment
- Speed: 15 teraflops
- Purpose: UK academic community use

HPCx was a supercomputer (actually a cluster of IBM eServer p5 575 high-performance servers) located at the Daresbury Laboratory in Cheshire, England. The supercomputer was maintained by the HPCx Consortium, UoE HPCX Ltd, which was led by the University of Edinburgh: EPCC, with the Science and Technology Facilities Council and IBM. The project was funded by EPSRC. The supercomputer was primarily used for various large-scale simulations such as molecular systems, crystalline structures, and coastal environments.

== History ==
The HPCx was the flagship UK academic supercomputer from its creation in December 2002, to 2007 when the larger HECToR system was installed. It was a joint venture ran under the Daresbury Laboratory of the Central Laboratory for Research Councils (CLRC) and Edinburgh Parallel Computing Centre (EPCC) at the University of Edinburgh EPSRC, who gave the college around £53 million (US$72.6 million) by 2004. The HPCx service ended in January 2010.

== Performance ==
The HPCx's service was divided into three phases, each with improved performance rates.

=== Phase one ===
Phase 1 of the HPCx service opened on 9 December 2002, although people had been using the service a month prior. During the first phase, the HPCx consisted of 1,280 IBM POWER4 p690 processors with 1.28 terabytes of memory, the “Colony” switch and 18 terabytes of high-speed disk, performing at a peak rate of around 6.6 teraflops.

=== Phase Three ===
By November 2006, the HPCx was given an additional 1,200 processors, leading to the performance of the supercomputer to rise to a peak of 15.4 teraflops and an average of around 12 teraflops.
