= Oxford e-Research Centre =

Academic department in the UK

- Abbreviation: OeRC
- Formation: 2006
- Location: Oxford
- Coordinates: 51.759710°N 1.258102°W
- Key people: Wes Armour; David De Roure; Janet Pierrehumbert; Susanna-Assunta Sansone; Anne Trefethen; David Wallom
- Parent organization: University of Oxford
- Website: www.oerc.ox.ac.uk

The Oxford e-Research Centre (OeRC) is part of the Department of Engineering Science within the University of Oxford in England and is a multidisciplinary informatics and Data science research and education institute.

The Centre was founded in 2006, and its work focuses on researching digital methodologies, information and computational solutions for academic research and industrial applications. OeRC has received EPSRC UK government funding.

The Centre participated in SOCIAM: The Theory and Practice of Social Machines, led in Nigel Shadbolt with David De Roure, Director OeRC, as co-investigator. OeRC is home to over 50 researchers. Disciplines the Centre is involved in are as diverse as musicology and astronomy, including international collaborations such as the Square Kilometre Array.

The Centre was headed by its Director David De Roure and Ron Perrott, a visiting professor at the OeRC before August 2017 when the Centre integrated with the Department of Engineering Science, with Wes Armour serving as the new head. Professor Susanna-Assunta Sansone is the current Director of OeRC with Prof Wes Armour and Prof David De Roure remaining as faculty. Other faculty include Min Chen, Janet Pierrehumbert, Anne Trefethen, and David Wallom
