= David W. Barron =

British academic

- Born: 9 January 1935
- Died: 2 January 2012 (aged 76); Southampton, Hampshire, England
- Siglum: DWB
- Citizenship: United Kingdom
- Known for: Ionospheric Studies; Programming Language Design and Implementation
- Scientific career
- Fields: Physics; Computer Science
- Workplaces: University of Cambridge Mathematical Laboratory; University of Southampton; British Computer Society
- Doctoral students: David De Roure (1990)

David William Barron FBCS (9 January 1935 – 2 January 2012) was a British academic in Physics and Computer Science who was described in the Times Higher Education magazine as one of the "founding fathers" of computer science.

== Family ==
He married his wife, Valerie. They had two children: Nik and Jacky.

== Work ==
=== Radio wave propagation ===
Barron's work with Henry Rishbeth on radio wave propagation was pioneering in furthering the understanding of how radio waves were reflected at the ionospheric boundary.

=== Computer science ===
Barron began his academic career in Cambridge University where he took a PhD in the Cavendish Laboratory. His research involved very early work in computer applications and he was a user of the original EDSAC computer, the world's first stored-program electronic computer to go into general service.

After his PhD he joined the Cambridge Mathematical Laboratory and contributed to the development of the EDSAC 2 computer. In the early 1960s, he was leader of software development in the Titan project, a joint effort with Ferranti Ltd to develop a reduced version of the Atlas computer. In this role he led the Cambridge efforts to develop the Titan Supervisor (a multi-programming operating system) and CPL (Combined Programming Language). The Titan Supervisor led in due course to the Cambridge Multiple-Access System which provided a pioneering time-sharing service to a large user community in Cambridge and was also later employed in the Cambridge-based Computer Aided Design Centre. The CPL project broke new ground in language design and application generality, and the resulting defining paper was written by the original development team. CPL was notable for leading to BCPL and hence B and then C programming language.

Barron left Cambridge in 1967 to take up a chair of computer science at the University of Southampton where he remained until his retirement in 2000. As a computer scientist, he contributed to many fields as computer science developed into a discipline of its own. At Southampton he continued his almost unique abilities in writing and lecturing. In 2009, on the 60th anniversary of the completion of the Cambridge EDSAC computer, he delivered a seminal lecture on what was involved in programming this pioneering machine in the 1950s.

He was one of the founding editors of Software: Practice and Experience, and served as the editor from 1971 for over 30 years.

Barron is the author of many texts that explained the emerging subject to generations of students and researchers. With others he published, in 1967, the manual for Titan Autocode programming. In subsequent years Barron wrote texts on Recursive Programming (1968), Assemblers and Loaders (1969), Operating Systems (1971 and 1984), Programming Languages (1977), Pascal Implementation (1981), Advanced Programming (1984), Text Processing and Typesetting (1987) and Scripting Languages (2000).

On his personal web page Barron modestly described himself as "old-fashioned scholar, relic of the past".
