= David Gavaghan =

British computing professor

- Born: David J. Gavaghan; 10 February 1966 (age 60)
- Education: Durham University (BSc); University of Oxford (MSc, DPhil)
- Scientific career
- Workplaces: University of Oxford
- Thesis: Parallel numerical algorithms for the solution of diffusion problems. (1992)
- Doctoral advisor: John Sidney Rollett
- Website: www.cs.ox.ac.uk/people/david.gavaghan

David J. Gavaghan (born 10 February 1966) is Professor of Computational Biology in the Department of Computer Science at the University of Oxford. He is also the director of the Life Sciences Interface Doctoral Training Centre, Principal Investigator of the Integrative Biology project and Research Fellow in Mathematics at New College, Oxford. In September 2026, it was announced that Gavaghan had been elected as the next President of Reuben College, Oxford.

== Education ==
Gavaghan completed his undergraduate degree in Mathematics at Durham University in 1986. This was followed by a Master of Science in Numerical Analysis and Mathematical Modelling in 1987 and his Doctor of Philosophy on the development of Parallel Numerical Algorithms in 1991 at Linacre College at the University of Oxford.

== Research and career ==
Gavaghan's research is interdisciplinary and involves the application of mathematical and computational techniques to problems in the biomedical sciences. Gavaghan serves on the advisory board chair for the Software Sustainability Institute (SSI).
