= MyGrid =

myGrid consortium
- Formation: 2001
- Type: e-Science organization
- Purpose: Developing software tools for scientists
- Location: Department of Computer Science, University of Manchester
- Principal investigator: Carole Goble
- Website: www.mygrid.org.uk

The myGrid consortium produces and uses a suite of tools design to “help e-Scientists get on with science and get on with scientists”. The tools support the creation of e-laboratories and have been used in domains as diverse as systems biology, social science, music, astronomy, multimedia and chemistry.

The consortium is led by Carole Goble of the Department of Computer Science at the University of Manchester, UK.

== Tools produced and used by myGrid ==
Tools developed by the myGrid consortium include:

- The Taverna workbench for designing, editing and executing scientific workflows
- myExperiment for sharing workflows and related data
- BioCatalogue a public registry of Web services for Life Scientists
- Seek produced in collaboration with the SysModb: Systems Biology of Micro-Organisms DataBase Finding, sharing and exchanging data, models and processes in Systems Biology
- MethodBox Browse datasets and share knowledge.
- RightField Sharing the meaning of your data by embedding ontology annotation in spreadsheets
- The Kidney and Urinary Pathway Database (KUPKB)
- Workflows for Ever (wf4ever) Scientific workflow preservation

== History ==
The consortium has three distinct phases:

=== Phase 1 ===
The consortium was formed in 2001, bringing together collaborators at the Universities of Manchester, Southampton, Newcastle, Nottingham and Sheffield, The European Molecular Biology Laboratory-European Bioinformatics Institute (EMBL-EBI) in Cambridge, and industrial partners GlaxoSmithKline, Merck KGaA, AstraZeneca, Sun Microsystems, IBM, GeneticXchange, Epistemics and Cerebra, (formerly Network Inference). The UK Engineering and Physical Sciences Research Council funded the first phase of the project with £3.5 million.

To date, Grid development has focused on the basic issues of storage, computation and resource management needed to make a global scientific community's information and tools accessible in a high performance environment. However, from an e-Science viewpoint, the purpose of the Grid is to deliver a collaborative and supportive environment that allows geographically distributed scientists to achieve research goals more effectively. MyGrid will design, develop and demonstrate higher level functionalities over an existing Grid infrastructure that support scientists in making use of complex distributed resources.

The project has developed an e-Science workbench called Taverna that supports:

- the scientific process of experimental investigation, evidence accumulation and result assimilation;
- the scientist's use of the community's information; and
- scientific collaboration, allowing dynamic groupings to tackle emergent research problems.

The myGrid project has also developed myExperiment to allow sharing of scientific workflows from Taverna and other Scientific workflow systems.

The Taverna workbench supports individual scientists by providing personalisation facilities relating to resource selection, data management and process enactment. The design and development activity will be informed by and evaluated using problems in bioinformatics, which is characterised by a highly distributed community, with many shared tools resources. myGrid will develop two application environments, one that supports individual scientists in the analysis of functional genomic data, and another that supports the annotation of a pattern database. Both of these tasks require explicit representation and enactment of scientific processes, and have challenging performance requirements.

=== Phase 2 ===
In phase 2, from 2006 to 2009, the consortium is funded for £2 million as part of the Open Middleware Infrastructure Institute. The membership of the consortium was concentrated in the University of Manchester and EMBL-EBI.

=== Phase 3 ===
In December 2008, the UK's Engineering and Physical Sciences Research Council approved the team's renewal grant proposal. The grant is for £1.15m and started in January 2009. The members of the myGrid team for Phase 3 are the University of Manchester and the University of Southampton. The project is organised around 4 themes: Knowledge Management for e-Science, Metadata management in e-Laboratories, Scientific Workflow Design, Management and Enactment, and Social Computing for e-Scientists. The Social Computing theme is oriented around the myExperiment Virtual research environment (VRE) for the social curation and sharing of scientific Research Objects.
