= Classification Commune des Actes Médicaux =

Classification Commune des Actes Médicaux is a French medical classification for clinical procedures. Starting in 2005, the CCAM serves as the reimbursement classification for clinicians. The CCAM was evaluated using OpenGALEN tools and technologies.

This classification is used to establish

- In private practice and hospital fees for acts performed during technical consultations
- In private clinics, the fees for procedures performed
- In public and private hospitals, the DRG and its pricing of hospital stays provided to health insurance as part of T2 A.

The choice of acts of this nomenclature is up to the Evaluation Commission of Acts Professionals (CEAP) of the High Authority of Health

It coexists with the Nomenclature Générale des Actes Professionnels (NGAP).

== Structure ==
In the version V2, the ACPC 7623 codes included. Each is accompanied by wording to clarify its meaning unambiguously followed by its price in euros and tariff details.

=== Code Principal ===
Explicit hierarchical coding. This code and / or its title in the presence of personally identifiable information may impair the protection of people and lift the confidentiality of those who entrust themselves to organizations and managed care organization.

Each code comprises the four letters and three numbers.

- The first letter refers to a large anatomical unit;
- The second letter indicates the body (or function) in the unit corresponding to the first letter;
- The third letter denotes the action performed;
- The fourth letter identifies the surgical approach or technique used.

The next three digits are used to differentiate between acts with four identical letters keys.

e.g. HHFA001: Appendectomy, for the first quadrant

                      HH. F A. 001
                      Action Technical topography Counter

=== Hierarchical ACPC ===
CCAM codes are structured in a tree whose top-level comprises 19 chapters, organized mainly by large anatomical structure or function:

- 01. central nervous system, device and independent
- 02. eye and notes
- 03. ear
- 04. circulatory
- 05. immune system and hematopoietic
- 06. respiratory
- 07. digestive
- 08. urinary and genital
- 09. acts on the reproductive, pregnancy and the newborn
- 10. endocrine and metabolic
- 11. osteoarticular apparatus and muscle of the head
- 12. osteoarticular apparatus and muscle neck and trunk
- 13. osteoarticular apparatus and muscle of the upper limb
- 14. osteoarticular apparatus and muscle of lower limb
- 15. osteoarticular apparatus and muscle without precision surveying
- 16. integumentary system - mammary glands
- 17. acts without precision surveying
- 18. anesthetic actions and additional statements
- 19. transitional adjustments to the acpc

The second level separates the diagnostic and therapeutic procedures, it is optionally followed by one or more sub-levels.

== Modifiers acts and association ==
Some acts may receive more than their one or more main code details called Modifiers. A modifier is information associated with a label that identifies a particular criterion for the performance of an act or his recovery. It applies to a specific list of acts. Modifiers are explicitly allowed in respect of each of the acts concerned. The application of a modifier leads to a rate increase of the act. Only modifiers can be charged in connection with acts that have a tariff. The description of these modifiers is found in Article III-2 of Book III of the General Provisions official. Four modifiers than can be priced by deed.

In the context of pricing, the association of acts is the realization of several acts at the same time, for the same patient by the same doctor, since there is no incompatibility between these acts. Codes 1,2,3,4 or 5 and their application rates of these associations are listed in Article III-3 of Paper III.

== Versions of CCAM ==
Version 22 of the'TechnicalACPC will be applicable on September 30, 2013 for clinics and public hospitals. Version 21 shall be in use until that date.

The construction of the clinical ACPC on intellectual activities that is to say without tools or technical movement provided by the medical convention of 2005 was due to start before 2007. A survey of clinicians from FIFG is announced for late 2010.

=== Revision history ===
http://www.ameli.fr/fileadmin/user_upload/documents/DATE_CCAM.pdf%5B%5D:

- ACPC's V23 01.25.2011 Official Journal of 26 December 2010 applicable as of January 25, 2011
- V22 ACPC of 30/09/2010 (bariatric surgery, hyperbaric medicine, respiratory support, ...)
- ACPC V21 from 25/05/2010 (recasting of Anatomy Cyto Pathology)
- V20 ACPC 01/05/2010 (recast EBRT)
- ACPC V19 from 01/02/2010
- V18 ACPC 01/01/2010
- V17 ACPC of 19/10/2009
- V16 ACPC 28/05/2009
- ACPC V15 from 21/12/2008 (12001 codes acts)
- ACPC V14, 16/10/2008
- ACPC V13 from 01/05/2008
- V12 ACPC of 14/03/2008
- ACPC 28/12/2007
- V11 (7838 rate changes compared to version 10).
- V10 ACPC of 12/09/2007
- ACPC V9 of 28/06/2007
- V8 ACPC on 16/05/2007
- ACPC V7 of 16/04/2007
- ACPC's V6 16/09/2006
- ACPC V2 from 01/09/2005
- ACPC V1 25/03/2005
- ACPC V0bis, 27/11/2003
- V0 ACPC, 2002

Learn more about the site Health Insurance = 000310000000's ATIH
