= Invicta Grammar School =

Location
- Huntsman Lane; Maidstone, Kent, ME14 5DS; England; 51°16′29″N 0°32′07″E

Information
- Type: Grammar school; Academy
- Motto: Nurturing aspirations: Inspiring success
- Local authority: Kent
- Department for Education URN: 136582 Tables
- Ofsted: Reports
- Chair of Governors: Nick Ware
- Headteacher: Van Beales
- Staff: 129
- Gender: Girls
- Age: 11 to 18
- Enrolment: 1600
- Houses: Austen; Bronte; Colvin; Curie; Frank; Nightingale; Pankhurst; Roddick
- Website: http://www.invicta.viat.org.uk/

Invicta Grammar School is a grammar school with academy status in Maidstone, Kent, England. The school caters for girls between the ages of 11 and 16, with a coeducational sixth form.

== History ==
The school has previously been known as Maidstone School for Girls, and Maidstone Technical High School for Girls before that. It was only been changed into ‘Invicta Grammar School’ in the 1970s.

== Specialist status and awards ==
Invicta became a specialist Business and Enterprise College in September 2003. The school received an achievement award from the Department for Education and Skills in 2000, 2001 and 2002. It also has the Artsmark Gold and Sportsmark awards.

== GCSE results ==
2018–2019: 62.23% of Students achieved 9-7 grade or A*-A in further maths.

== A Level results ==
2018–2019: 10.14% A* grades, 51.39% A-B grades and 37.97 C-E grades were awarded to pupils.

== Buildings ==
Invicta Grammar School comprises several buildings. The Main Building, which is the common entrance building, contains the reception and dining hall — which links to a building called the Mezz, the food room and the assembly hall. The Main Building houses form rooms, science labs, the Learning Hub and Computer Science rooms on the top floor. The Main Building also links into the Extension Building, which includes an Art studio, the Lower School Student Support Centre and some Computer Science rooms.

The Invicta Grammar School site also includes the Albion Building, hosting a range of subjects including MFL (Multi-Foreign Languages such as French and Spanish), Science and Textiles. The Orchard Building opened in 2005 and primarily houses the English department, form rooms, the Upper School Student Support Centre and the Sixth Form Common Room. The Izatt Building opened in 2014 and primarily houses Maths, form rooms and the school's library. The Vinters Building, the newest building of the school, opened in September 2024 and houses form rooms and the Humanities subjects, including History, Geography, and Religious Studies.

The Drama and Dance studios are connected to each other in a single building. The Music Building consists of an Auditorium and multiple practice rooms.

== Notable alumnae ==
- Angela Barnes, English comedian
- Carole Goble, British computer scientist
- Anna Healey, English/German cricketer
- Rudi Dharmalingam, actor
