= BioCatalogue =

Life science catalogue

BioCatalogue.
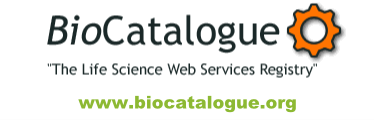

Content
- Description: The Life Science Web Service Registry

Contact
- Research center: Department of Computer Science, University of Manchester
- Primary citation: Bhagat et al

Access
- Website: http://www.biocatalogue.org

The BioCatalogue is a curated catalogue of Life Science Web Services. The BioCatalogue was launched in June 2009 at the Intelligent Systems for Molecular Biology Conference. The project is a collaboration between the myGrid project at the University of Manchester led by Carole Goble and the European Bioinformatics Institute led by Rodrigo Lopez. It is funded by the Biotechnology and Biological Sciences Research Council.

The BioCatalogue is based on an open source Ruby on Rails codebase like its sister project, myExperiment.
