= Resource map =

Concept in the Object Reuse and Exchange model

A resource map (ReM) is a concept of the ORE Model for associating an identity with compound digital objects (aggregations of digital resources) and making assertions about their structure and semantics. Compound objects combine distributed resources, including multiple media types.

== ReM Serialization ==
A Resource Map may be serialized (or represented) in several different formats including Atom feeds, RDF/XML, RDFa, and others.

The example below illustrates how a ReM can represent the arXiv e-print at https://arxiv.org/abs/astro-ph/0601007 using an Atom feed. Metadata such as the digital object identifier, title, and authors for the e-print are included first in the Atom feed. The e-print is a compound digital object composed of five aggregated resources which are listed next: OAI-PMH metadata about the e-print, a splash page, a PostScript version of the e-print, a PDF version, and a gzipped tar file containing multiple versions of the e-print.

== Notes ==
- Lagoze, Carl; Van de Sompel, Herbert (May 2007), Compound Information Objects: The OAI-ORE Perspective

== See also ==
- Open Archives Initiative Object Reuse and Exchange
- Atom Syndication Format
- Open Archives Initiative
