= Anne Trefethen =

Computer scientist

Anne Trefethen FREng
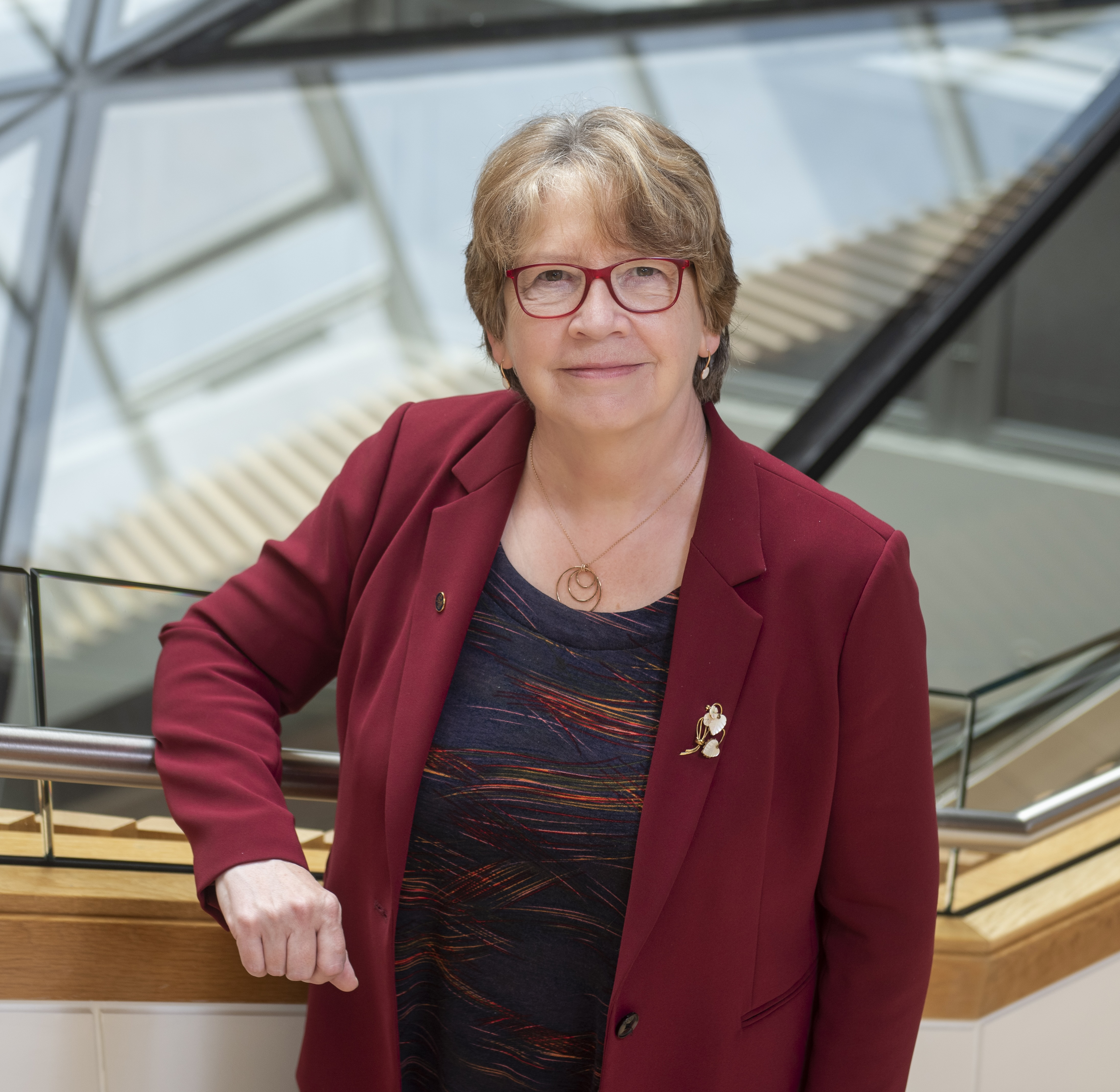
- Born: Anne Elizabeth Daman
- Education: Royal Military College of Science
- Spouse: Nick Trefethen (m. 1988–2008)
- Awards: Fellow of the Royal Academy of Engineering (2017)
- Scientific career
- Fields: High-performance computing Scientific computing
- Workplaces: Thinking Machines Corporation; Cornell Theory Center; Numerical Algorithms Group; University of Oxford

Anne Elizabeth Trefethen is a British computer scientist who is pro-vice-chancellor (people & digital), and professor of scientific computing at the University of Oxford. She is a fellow of St Cross College. Her work in industry and academia focuses on numerical algorithms and software, computational science and high-performance computing.

On 1 June 2018, Trefethen joined the board of the UK Statistics Authority as a non-executive director.

== Research and career ==
Trefethen was appointed pro-cice-chancellor (Academic Services and University Collections) at the University of Oxford in January 2015, and was responsible for overseeing the university's libraries, museums and collections and its language teaching services. She was appointed the university's first chief information officer in March 2012 until October 2017, prior to which she served as director of the Oxford e-Research Centre (2006–2012). and co-director of the Institute for the Future of Computing, part of the James Martin 21st Century School. Before coming to Oxford in 2005, Trefethen was deputy director and then director of the UK e-Science Core Programme that addressed broad issues in e-Science and grid computing through the development of middleware and infrastructure. From 1997 - 2001 she was vice-president for research and development at Numerical Algorithms Group (NAG) Ltd. Trefethen spent 1988-1997 in the US at Thinking Machines Corporation and was associate director for Scientific Computational Support at the Cornell Theory Center.

In 2017 she was elected a fellow of the Royal Academy of Engineering.

== Publications ==
- Sansone, Susanna-Assunta, et al. "Toward interoperable bioscience data." Nature genetics 44.2 (2012): 121–126.
- Hey, Tony, and Anne E. Trefethen. "Cyberinfrastructure for e-Science." Science 308.5723 (2005): 817–821.
- Hey, Anthony JG, and Anne E. Trefethen. "The data deluge: An e-science perspective." (2003): 809–824.
- Hey, Tony, and Anne Trefethen. "e-Science and its implications." Philosophical Transactions of the Royal Society of London A: Mathematical, Physical and Engineering Sciences 361.1809 (2003): 1809–1825.
- Hey, Tony, and Anne E. Trefethen. "The UK e-science core programme and the grid." Future Generation Computer Systems 18.8 (2002): 1017–1031.
