= Nick Trefethen =

American mathematician

Nick Trefethen FRS
- Born: Lloyd Nicholas Trefethen; 30 August 1955 (age 71)
- Education: Harvard University; Stanford University
- Known for: Embree–Trefethen constant
- Spouses: Anne Trefethen (née Daman) (m. 1988–2008) Kate McLoughlin (m. 2011)
- Children: one son, one daughter
- Awards: Leslie Fox Prize for Numerical Analysis (1985); FRS (2005); IMA Gold Medal (2010)
- Scientific career
- Fields: Numerical analysis
- Workplaces: Harvard University; University of Oxford; New York University; MIT; Cornell University
- Thesis: Wave Propagation and Stability for Finite Difference Schemes (1982)
- Doctoral advisor: Joseph E. Oliger
- Doctoral students: Alan Edelman
- Website: people.maths.ox.ac.uk/trefethen

Lloyd Nicholas Trefethen (born 30 August 1955) is an American mathematician, professor of numerical analysis and until 2023 head of the Numerical Analysis Group at the Mathematical Institute, University of Oxford. He was elected a Member of the National Academy of Sciences in 2025.

== Early life and education ==
Trefethen was born 30 August 1955 in Boston, Massachusetts, the son of mechanical engineer Lloyd M. Trefethen and codebreaker, poet, teacher and editor Florence Newman Trefethen. Trefethen attended Phillips Exeter Academy.

He obtained his bachelor's degree from Harvard College in 1977 and his master's from Stanford University in 1980. His PhD was on Wave Propagation and Stability for Finite Difference Schemes supervised by Joseph E. Oliger at Stanford University.

== Career and research ==
Following his PhD, Trefethen went on to work at the Courant Institute of Mathematical Sciences in New York, Massachusetts Institute of Technology, and Cornell University, before being appointed to a chair at the University of Oxford and a Fellowship of Balliol College, Oxford.

His publications span a wide range of areas within numerical analysis and applied mathematics, including non-normal eigenvalue problems and applications, spectral methods for differential equations, numerical linear algebra, fluid mechanics, computational complex analysis, and approximation theory. He is perhaps best known for his work on pseudospectra of non-normal matrices and operators. This work covers theoretical aspects as well as numerical algorithms, and applications including fluid mechanics, numerical solution of partial differential equations, numerical linear algebra, shuffling of cards, random matrices, differential equations and lasers. Trefethen is currently an ISI highly cited researcher.

Trefethen has written a number of books on numerical analysis including Numerical Linear Algebra with David Bau, Spectral Methods in MATLAB, Schwarz–Christoffel Mapping with Tobin Driscoll, and Spectra and Pseudospectra: The Behavior of Nonnormal Matrices and Operators with Mark Embree. He is the leader of the MATLAB-based Chebfun software project.

In 2013 he proposed a new formula to calculate the BMI of a person:

$$\text{BMI} = 1.3 \times \frac{\text{weight}\,\,\,\,}{\text{height}^{2.5}}$$

(International System of Units)

=== Books ===
- Numerical Linear Algebra (SIAM, 1997) with David Bau
- Spectral Methods in Matlab (SIAM, 2000)
- Schwarz-Christoffel Mapping (Cambridge, 2002) with T. A. Driscoll
- Spectra and Pseudospectra: The Behavior of Nonnormal Matrices and Operators (Princeton, 2005) with Mark Embree
- Trefethen's Index Cards (World Scientific 2011)
- Approximation Theory and Approximation Practice (SIAM, 2013 and 2020)
- Exploring ODEs (SIAM, 2018) with Á. Birkisson and T. A. Driscoll
- An Applied Mathematician’s Apology (SIAM, 2022)

=== Awards and honours ===
Trefethen was the first winner of the Leslie Fox Prize for Numerical Analysis. In 1998 he was an Invited Speaker of the International Congress of Mathematicians in Berlin. He is a fellow of the American Mathematical Society, and a member of the National Academy of Engineering in the United States. Trefethen was elected a Fellow of the Royal Society (FRS) in 2005, and his certificate of election reads:

Nick Trefethen is distinguished for his many seminal contributions to Numerical Analysis and its applications in Applied Mathematics and in Engineering Science. His research spans theory, algorithms, software and physical applications, particularly involving eigenvalues, pseudospectra – a concept which he introduced – and dynamics. He has an international reputation for his work on nonnormal matrices and operators. He has also made major contributions to finite difference and spectral methods for partial differential equations, numerical linear algebra, and complex analysis. His monograph Numerical Linear Algebra (SIAM, 1997) is one of the SIAM's best selling books and has already been through five printings.

In 2010 Trefethen was awarded the Gold Medal of the Institute of Mathematics and its Applications in recognition of his "outstanding contributions to mathematics and its applications over a period of years". In 2013 Trefethen was awarded the Naylor Prize and lectureship in Applied Mathematics from the London Mathematical Society. He was awarded the George Pólya Prize for Mathematical Exposition in 2017 and the John von Neumann Prize in 2020 by SIAM.

== Personal life ==
Trefethen has one son and one daughter from his first marriage to Anne Elizabeth Trefethen (née Daman). He is currently married to Kate McLoughlin, a professor of English literature at Oxford.
