= Florence Newman Trefethen =

American codebreaker, historian of operations research, poet

Florence Marion Newman Trefethen (1921–2012) was an American codebreaker, historian of operations research, poet, and English instructor.

== Early life and education ==
Florence Marion Newman was born in 1921, in Philadelphia. She graduated magna cum laude from Bryn Mawr College in 1943.

She enlisted as a Naval officer during World War II, and served in the WAVES as a codebreaker. She was part of the Magic project, whose decryptions of Japanese communications led to the ambush and death of Japanese Admiral Isoroku Yamamoto. During this service she met naval officer and later mechanical engineering professor Lloyd M. Trefethen; they married in 1944.

After the war, she came to Girton College, Cambridge on an Ottilie Hancock Bye Fellowship. She earned a Master of Letters there in 1946.

== Career and later life ==
Trefethen taught English at Tufts University for many years, and served for 18 years as executive editor for the Council of East Asian Studies at Harvard University.

She and her husband had had two children, quilter Gwyned Trefethen in 1953 and mathematician Lloyd N. Trefethen in 1955. She died on March 1, 2012.

== Books ==
With Joseph F. McCloskey, Trefethen edited the book Operations Research for Management (Johns Hopkins University Press, 1954). She wrote the first chapter of the book, an early history of the field of operations research.

She is also the author of Writing a Poem (The Writer, 1970), on the process of writing poetry.
