= Cray XT6 =

The Cray XT6 is an updated version of the Cray XT5 supercomputer, launched on 16 November 2009. The dual- or quad-core AMD Opteron 2000-series processors of the XT5 are replaced in the XT6 with eight- or 12-core Opteron 6100 processors, giving up to 2,304 cores per cabinet. The XT6 includes the same SeaStar2+ interconnect router as the XT5, which is used to provide a 3-dimensional torus network topology between nodes. Each XT6 node has two processor sockets, one SeaStar2+ router and either 32 or 64 GB of DDR3 SDRAM memory. Four nodes form one X6 compute blade.

The XT6 family run the Cray Linux Environment version 3. This incorporates SUSE Linux Enterprise Server and Cray's Compute Node Linux.

The XT6m variant, announced at the same time as the XT6, is a mid-ranged supercomputer with most of the features of the XT6, but with a processor interconnect optimized for system sizes between 700 and 13000 cores and scalable up to 6 cabinets.

The first customer for the XT6 was the Engineering and Physical Sciences Research Council (EPSRC) of the United Kingdom, which upgraded the existing XT5h system, named HECToR, at the University of Edinburgh in 2010.
