= Mark Plumbley =

Mark Plumbley from Queen Mary University of London, UK was named Fellow of the Institute of Electrical and Electronics Engineers (IEEE) in 2015 for contributions to latent variable analysis.
