= Terminology server =

A terminology server is a piece of software providing a range of terminology-related software services through an applications programming interface to its client applications.

Typical terminology services might include:

- Matching an arbitrary, user-defined text entry string (or regular expression) against a fixed internal list of natural language expressions, possibly using word equivalent, alternate spelling, abbreviation or part-of-speech substitution tables, and other lexical resources, to increase the recall and precision of the matching algorithm
- Retrieving any asserted associations between a fixed list of terminology expressions in one language and translations in another natural language
- Retrieving any asserted associations between a fixed list of terminology expressions, and entities in a concept system or ontology (information science)
- Retrieving any asserted or inferrable semantic links between concepts in a concept system or ontology (information science), particularly subsumption (Is-a) relationships
- Retrieving any directly asserted, or the best approximate indirectly inferrable, associations between concepts in an ontology and entities in one or more external resources (e.g. libraries of images, decision support rules or statistical classifications)

== See also ==
- Clinical terminology server
