= Edinburgh Concurrent Supercomputer =

The Edinburgh Concurrent Supercomputer (ECS) was a large Meiko Computing Surface supercomputer. This transputer-based, massively parallel system was installed at the University of Edinburgh during the late 1980s and early 1990s.

== History ==
Following a pilot project involving an early 40-transputer Computing Surface installed in April 1986, funding was obtained from SERC and the DTI for a much larger system using T800 transputers and a MicroVAX fileserver. The Edinburgh Concurrent Supercomputer Project (ECSP) was formed to manage and support the facility, which was commissioned at the end of 1987.

Over the next few years, the system received several upgrades, including more transputers (reaching, at its peak, around 400 processors) and the installation of M²VCS and MeikOS system software, which enabled multi-user access and removed the need for the MicroVAX.

In 1990, the Edinburgh Concurrent Supercomputer Project was succeeded by the Edinburgh Parallel Computing Centre, which consolidated the project with other parallel computing resources and activities within the university. The ECS continued to be used for a variety of academic and commercial research work.

In October 1992 the ECS was reconfigured as a SPARC-hosted Computing Surface with three SPARC "host" processors running SunOS and around 380 T800s. The system was finally decommissioned in August 1994.
