= Journal of Biomedical Semantics =

- Discipline: Biomedical semantics
- Language: English
- Edited by: Dietrich Rebholz-Schuhmann, Goran Nenadic

Publication details
- History: 2010–present
- Publisher: BioMed Central
- Frequency: Upon acceptance
- Open access: Yes
- License: Creative Commons Attribution License

Standard abbreviations
- ISO 4: J. Biomed. Semant.

Indexing
- ISSN: 2041-1480
- LCCN: 2010247773
- OCLC no.: 610018393

Links
- Journal homepage; Online access

The Journal of Biomedical Semantics is a peer-reviewed open-access scientific journal that covers biomedical semantics.

== History ==
It was established in 2010 and is published by BioMed Central. The editors-in-chief are Dietrich Rebholz-Schuhmann (University of Zurich) and Goran Nenadic (University of Manchester). The journal is abstracted and indexed in Scopus, Science Citation Index Expanded, and BIOSIS Previews.
