= Pseudospectrum =

In mathematics, the pseudospectrum of an operator is a set containing the spectrum of the operator and the numbers that are "almost" eigenvalues. Knowledge of the pseudospectrum can be particularly useful for understanding non-normal operators and their eigenfunctions.

The ε-pseudospectrum of a matrix A consists of all eigenvalues of matrices which are ε-close to A:

$$\Lambda_\epsilon(A) = \{\lambda \in \mathbb{C} \mid \exists x \in \mathbb{C}^n \setminus \{0\}, \exists E \in \mathbb{C}^{n \times n} \colon (A+E)x = \lambda x, \|E\| \leq \epsilon \}.$$

Numerical algorithms which calculate the eigenvalues of a matrix give only approximate results due to rounding and other errors. These errors can be described with the matrix E.

More generally, for Banach spaces $X,Y$ and operators $A: X \to Y$ , one can define the $\epsilon$-pseudospectrum of $A$ (typically denoted by $\text{sp}_{\epsilon}(A)$) in the following way

$$\text{sp}_{\epsilon}(A) = \{\lambda \in \mathbb{C} \mid \|(A-\lambda I)^{-1}\| \geq 1/\epsilon \}.$$

where we use the convention that $\|(A-\lambda I)^{-1}\| = \infty$ if $A - \lambda I$ is not invertible.

== Bibliography ==
- Lloyd N. Trefethen and Mark Embree: "Spectra And Pseudospectra: The Behavior of Nonnormal Matrices And Operators", Princeton Univ. Press, ISBN 978-0691119465 (2005).
