= OMII-UK =

OMII-UK (Open Middleware Infrastructure Institute) is an open-source software organisation for the UK research community. It was launched in 2004.

OMII-UK have a number of roles within the UK research community: helping new users get started with E-research, providing the software that is needed and developing, that software if it does not exist. OMII-UK also help to guide the development of E-research by liaising with national and international organisations, e-Research groups, standards' groups, and the researchers themselves.

== Funding ==
OMII-UK is funded by the Engineering and Physical Sciences Research Council (EPSRC) and Jisc.

== Project partners ==
OMII-UK is a collaboration between three bodies:

- the School of Electronics and Computer Science at the University of Southampton
- the Open Grid Services Architecture (OGSA)-DAI project at the National e-Science Centre and EPCC
- the myGrid project at the School of Computer Science at the University of Manchester

== Project history ==
The OMII (Open Middleware Infrastructure Institute) started at the University of Southampton in January 2004. In January 2006, the Southampton group joined forces with the established myGrid and OGSA-DAI projects to form OMII-UK - an integral part of the UK e-Science programme.

== See also ==
- e-Science
- Open Grid Forum (OGF)
- Job Submission Description Language (JSDL)
- Business Process Execution Language (BPEL)
