= Object Reuse and Exchange =

Archival standards

The Open Archives Initiative Object Reuse and Exchange (OAI-ORE) defines standards for the description and exchange of aggregations of web resources. The OAI-ORE specification implements the ORE Model which introduces the resource map (ReM) that makes it possible to associate an identity with aggregations of resources and make assertions about their structure and semantics.

These aggregations (sometimes called compound digital objects or compound information objects) may combine distributed resources together, and with multiple media types including text, images, data, and video. The goal of OAI-ORE is to expose the rich content in aggregations to applications that support authoring, deposit, exchange, visualization, reuse, and preservation.

The Andrew W. Mellon Foundation funded two years of work on the OAI-ORE project in 2006–2008. Version 1.0 of the specification was released on 17 October 2008.

== Introduction ==
The ORE standard is concerned with the description of aggregations of web resources. It defines 4 entities:

- the Aggregation itself, identified by its URI but without any corresponding concrete resource. It is a conceptual resource. Being uniquely identified it can enter into relationships with other resources, in particular aggregations of aggregations become possible.
- the Aggregated Resource: any resource part of an aggregation, identified by its URI
- the Resource Map: a resource describing an aggregation based on a set of assertions. A mandatory assertion indicates which aggregation the Resource Map itself is describing. Other assertions indicate the aggregated resource(s). Certain metadata are mandatory as well, such as the map creator. Dublin Core terms are used for this purpose.
- the proxy: a virtual resource acting as a proxy for a certain aggregated resource in the context of a certain aggregation. Its use is optional. A so-called lineage relationship can be established between proxy resources to trace the origin of an aggregated resource from another aggregation.

The standard accounts for the possible redundant description of the same aggregation and defines the notion of authoritative Resource Map. It also consider the notions of similar aggregations and of type of aggregated resources.

The standard is open in the sense that a Resource Map may include any additional assertions about resources.

Finally, the ORE standard builds upon the Cool URIs guideline, which discussed two strategies for not confusing a thing and some representation of it.

== See also ==
- Atom (standard)

== Bibliography ==
- Lagoze, Carl; Van de Sompel, Herbert (May 2007), Compound Information Objects: The OAI-ORE Perspective
- Lagoze, Carl; Van de Sompel, Herbert; Nelson, Michael L.; Warner, Simeon; Sanderson, Robert; Johnston, Pete (2008-04-14), "Object Re-Use & Exchange: A Resource-Centric Approach", arXiv:0804.2273 [cs.DL]
- Van de Sompel, Herbert; Lagoze, Carl (Aug 2007), "Interoperability for the Discovery, Use, and Re-Use of Units of Scholarly Communication", CTWatch Quarterly, 3 (3)
- ORE User Guide - Primer (2008)
