= Lloyd M. Trefethen =

American fluid dynamicist

Lloyd MacGregor Trefethen
- Born: March 5, 1919; Waltham, Massachusetts, U.S.
- Died: November 6, 2001 (aged 82); Cambridge, Massachusetts, U.S.
- Education: Webb Institute (BS, 1940); Massachusetts Institute of Technology (MS, 1942); University of Cambridge (PhD, 1950)
- Known for: surface tension research, invention of the heat pipe, study of Coriolis effect on bathtub vortices
- Spouse: Florence Newman (m. 1944)
- Children: Lloyd N. Trefethen, Gwyned Trefethen
- Awards: ASME Fellow
- Scientific career
- Fields: Fluid dynamics, mechanical engineering
- Institutions: National Science Foundation; Harvard University; Tufts University
- Thesis: Heat Transfer Properties of Liquid Metals (1950)

Lloyd MacGregor Trefethen (March 5, 1919 – November 6, 2001) was an American fluid dynamicist. He served as a professor of mechanical engineering at Tufts University for more than 40 years. His work included research on surface tension, independent invention of the heat pipe, and an experimental investigation of the Coriolis effect on draining vortices. He also co-authored a notable paper on card shuffling.

== Early life and education ==
Trefethen was born on March 5, 1919, in Waltham, Massachusetts. He graduated from the Webb Institute in 1940, and he received a master’s degree in naval engineering from the Massachusetts Institute of Technology in 1942.

During World War II, Trefethen first enlisted in the United States Merchant Marine because he knew he could not pass the Navy eye exam. However, after memorizing the eye chart, he passed the exam and became a naval officer. There he met Florence Newman, a Navy codebreaker who later taught in Tufts University’s english department. They married in 1944. Their son, Lloyd N. Trefethen, later became a notable mathematician; they also had an older daughter, the quilter Gwyned Trefethen.

In 1950, Trefethen completed a Ph.D. at the University of Cambridge. Although his initial research plan was to study the cooling of turbine blades, his eventual dissertation was Heat Transfer Properties of Liquid Metals. His work sparked an ongoing interest in magnetohydrodynamics at Cambridge.

== Career and later life ==
On returning to the US, Trefethen took a managerial position at the National Science Foundation before joining Harvard University as an assistant professor of engineering in 1954. He moved to Tufts University in 1958, where he became a full professor and chair of the mechanical engineering department. He retired in 1989.

Trefethen died on November 6, 2001 in Cambridge, Massachusetts.

== Contributions ==
Trefethen was known for his research on surface tension in liquids, and he was one of the independent inventors of the heat pipe. In 1963, he made an award-winning educational film, Surface Tension in Fluid Mechanics, as part of a series produced by the National Committee on Fluid Mechanics Films. Trefethen's fluid mechanics research also included a widely reported investigation into whether the Coriolis force causes a draining vortex in the Southern Hemisphere to rotate opposite to the direction reported by Ascher Shapiro a few years earlier for the Northern Hemisphere.^{[A]}

Beyond fluid dynamics, Trefethen's publications include a paper with his son Lloyd N. Trefethen on the Gilbert–Shannon–Reeds model, a mathematical model of shuffling playing cards. In contrast to earlier research suggesting that seven riffles are needed to remove any patterns from an unshuffled deck of cards, Trefethen and Trefethen showed that, in their model of the problem, five riffles are enough.^{[B]}

== Recognition ==
Trefethen was a Fellow of the ASME. In 1999, a special issue of the Journal of Fluids Engineering was dedicated to him in honor of his 80th birthday.

== Selected publications ==
A.	Trefethen, Lloyd M.; Bilger, R. W.; Fink, P. T.; Luxton, R. E.; Tanner, R. I. (September 1965). "The bath-tub vortex in the Southern Hemisphere". Nature. 207 (5001): 1084–1085. Bibcode:1965Natur.207.1084T. doi:10.1038/2071084a0. S2CID 4249876.

B.	Trefethen, L. N.; Trefethen, L. M. (2000). "How many shuffles to randomize a deck of cards?". Proceedings of the Royal Society of London. Series A: Mathematical, Physical and Engineering Sciences. 456 (2002): 2561–2568. Bibcode:2000RSPSA.456.2561T. doi:10.1098/rspa.2000.0625. MR 1796496. S2CID 14055379.
