= International Journal of Cooperative Information Systems =

- Discipline: Computer science
- Language: English

Publication details
- Publisher: World Scientific (Singapore)
- Impact factor: 1.929 (2019)

Standard abbreviations
- ISO 4: Int. J. Coop. Inf. Syst.

Indexing
- ISSN: 0218-8430 (print); 1793-6365 (web)

Links
- Journal homepage

The International Journal of Cooperative Information Systems was founded in 1992 and is published by World Scientific. It "addresses the intricacies of cooperative work in the framework of distributed interoperable information systems" from principles, frameworks, and methodology, to actual application in business process management systems.

== Abstracting and indexing ==
The journal is abstracted and indexed in Current Contents/Engineering, Computing & Technology, CompuMath Citation Index, and Inspec.
