= Ilkay Altintas =

Turkish-American data and computer scientist (born 1977)

- İlkay Altıntaş
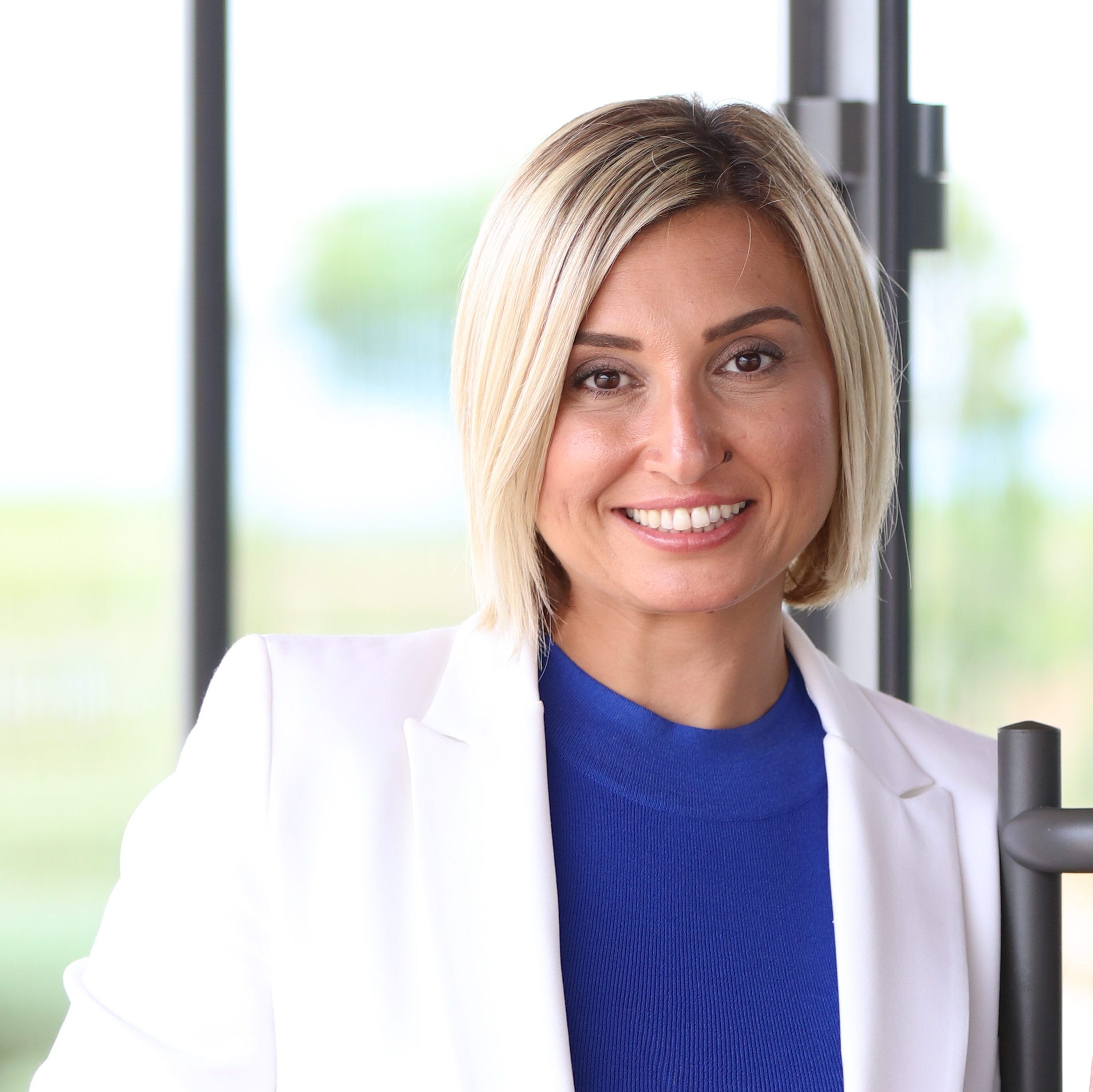
- Altintas in 2019
- Born: İlkay Altıntaş; 1977 (age 48–49); Aydın, Turkey
- Citizenship: Turkey; United States
- Education: METU (BS, MS); University of Amsterdam (PhD)
- Known for: Kepler scientific workflow system
- Scientific career
- Fields: Data science; Big data; Workflow management; Distributed computing; Provenance; Reproducibility
- Workplaces: University of California, San Diego; San Diego Supercomputer Center
- Thesis: Collaborative Provenance for Workflow-Driven Science and Engineering (2011)
- Doctoral advisor: Peter Sloot
- Website: scil.ucsd.edu/ilkay

Ilkay Altintas is a Turkish-American data and computer scientist, and researcher in the domain of supercomputing and high-performance computing applications. Since 2015, Altintas has served as chief data science officer of the San Diego Supercomputer Center (SDSC), at the University of California, San Diego, where she has also served as founder and director of the Workflows for Data Science Center of Excellence (WorDS) since 2014, as well as founder and director of the WIFIRE lab. Altintas is also the co-initiator of the Kepler scientific workflow system, an open-source platform that endows research scientists with the ability to readily collaborate, share, and design scientific workflows.

Born in Aydın, Turkey, Altintas attended Middle East Technical University before embarking on a research career. While pursuing her career as a research scientist, she completed her PhD at the University of Amsterdam in 2011. In addition to her work as a research scientist, she is a computer science lecturer at the University of California, San Diego. Altintas is also a co-founder and board member of the Data Science Alliance nonprofit. She serves on the advisory board of several national agencies and companies, and as an editor of peer-reviewed scientific journals.

== Education ==
Altintas graduated from Middle East Technical University in Ankara, Turkey with a bachelor's degree in computer engineering in 1999, and a master's degree in computer engineering in 2001. In 2011, she received a PhD in computational science from the University of Amsterdam in the Netherlands, for her work and contributions toward workflow-driven collaborative science.

== Career and research ==
After graduating from Middle East Technical University in 2001, Altintas was hired as a research programmer at the San Diego Supercomputer Center (SDSC). She went on to serve SDSC as the assistant director of the National Laboratory for Advanced Data Research, the founder and director of the Scientific Workflow Automation Technologies Laboratory, and deputy coordinator for research. Currently, she is the chief data science officer of SDSC, where she is also the founder and director of the Workflows for Data Science Center of Excellence (WorDS); the founder and director of the WIFIRE lab; and the division director for Cyberinfrastructure Research, Education and Development. The WorDS hub at SDSC serves to promote the utilization and distribution of workflow services in the context of a variety of domains and projects, ranging from the WIFIRE lab (which Altintas founded and currently directs) to the Kepler scientific workflow system (which Altintas serves as the co-initiator of).

=== WIFIRE Lab ===
On October 26, 2003, Altintas experienced California wildfires for the first time, after witnessing the Cedar Fire in San Diego County. The environmental and economic toll that this natural disaster had on the residents of San Diego County inspired Altintas to contribute to improving the then-current systems of managing and predicting wildfires. She allotted much of her time thereafter to learning about California's fire-adapted ecosystem, and the two factors, weather and fuel, that contribute significantly to the spread and dynamic behavior of wildfires. She noted that the behavior of wildfires can be computationally modeled, with data for modeling purposes being pulled from the physical environment (e.g., landscape data, real-time weather information and camera imagery, and remote sensor data). This spurred the creation of Altintas' brainchild, the WIFIRE lab, which received National Science Foundation (NSF) funding from 2013 to 2018. Using scalable computing and dynamic, automated, scientific workflows, data are collected and processed, and can be retrieved and accessed by a diverse array of audiences. The main accomplishments of the WIFIRE lab till date include the deployment of data integration services at the intersection of fire science, data management, and machine learning; real-time data driven fire modeling services (with the help of the High Performance Wireless Research and Education Network (HPWREN)); and automated fire modeling workflows and machine learning pipelines. The WIFIRE lab currently serves a community of 130+ organizations, and works to combine data science and fire science to aid in dynamic fire modeling at scale. Altintas has presented on past and ongoing WIFIRE research to a variety of audiences, ranging from stakeholders and policymakers at the California State Capitol to UC San Diego School of Global Policy and Strategy (GPS) Science Policy Fellows Program graduate students.

The real-time fire modeling services provided by the WIFIRE lab have aided in the identification and traceability of wildfire outbreaks in local California communities. In addition to aiding in the identification and traceability of wildfire outbreaks, the framework of the services deployed by WIFIRE is being used toward aiding in the identification and traceability of the COVID-19 outbreak. The application of the real-time map (used initially for wildfire identification) in the space of COVID-19 research serves the purpose of alerting individuals in real-time regarding information surrounding the spread and severity of the virus in certain areas.

For her pioneering WIFIRE work, Altintas has been featured on various US-based radio broadcasts, newspapers, and magazines. She has been featured on Time magazine, the National Public Radio, The New York Times, and Voice of America, along with research scientists whom she has collaborated with. She has also been featured on the University of California Television channel for her WIFIRE research.

=== The Kepler Project ===
Altintas is the co-initiator of the Kepler scientific workflow system, an open source platform that allows its users to share and collaborate on workflows for a variety of applications. The Kepler Project website provides its visitors with the opportunity to download the Kepler application. It also serves as a home for information regarding upcoming Kepler-related workshops, references on how to use Kepler for a varied set of subjects and applications (such as bioinformatics), and tips regarding how to maneuver the application in an effective manner.

=== Teaching ===
Altintas currently serves as the faculty co-director of the Master of Advanced Studies in Data Science and Engineering, and as a lecturer in the Department of Computer Science and Engineering, at UC San Diego. In addition, she is a data MOOC instructor through Coursera and edX.

=== Awards and honors ===
- White House Office of Science and Technology Policy Invited Workshop Speaker (2016)
- Halıcıoğlu Data Science Institute (HDSI) Fellow, Inducted by invitation, University of California, San Diego (2018)
- Pi Person of the Year, Inaugural Recipient, San Diego Supercomputer Center (SDSC) (2014)
- Innovations in Networking Award for Experimental Applications, Corporation for Education Network Initiatives in California (CENIC) (2018)
- Emerging Woman Leader in Technical Computing Award, Association for Computing Machinery's Special Interest Group on High Performance Computing (ACM SIGHPC) (2017)
- Peter Chen Big Data Young Researcher Award, The Services Society (2017)
- Award for Excellence for Early Career Researchers, Institute of Electrical and Electronics Engineers (IEEE), Technical Committee on Scalable Computing (TCSC) (2015)
- Best Workshop Paper Award for "Towards an Integrated Cyberinfrastructure for Scalable Data-Driven Monitoring, Dynamic Prediction and Resilience of Wildfires," International Conference on Computational Science (ICCS), Reykjavík, Iceland (2015)
- Editor's Choice Awards, HPCwire (2014)
  - Best Application of Big Data in HPC
  - Best Data-Intensive System (End User focused)
- Reader's Choice Award for Best Application of Big Data in HPC, HPCwire (2014)

== See also ==
- List of female scientists in the 21st century
- List of Middle East Technical University alumni
- List of University of Amsterdam alumni
