= BioCompute Object =

- Abbreviation: BCO
- Status: Active IEEE Working Group
- Related standards: Common Workflow Language
- License: BSD-3-clause
- Website: osf.io/h59uh/

The BioCompute Object (BCO) project is a community-driven initiative to build a framework for standardizing and sharing computations and analyses generated from High-throughput sequencing (HTS—also referred to as next-generation sequencing or massively parallel sequencing). The project has since been standardized as IEEE 2791-2020, and the project files are maintained in an open source repository. The July 22nd, 2020 edition of the Federal Register announced that the FDA now supports the use of BioCompute (officially known as IEEE 2791-2020) in regulatory submissions, and the inclusion of the standard in the Data Standards Catalog for the submission of HTS data in NDAs, ANDAs, BLAs, and INDs to CBER, CDER, and CFSAN.

Originally started as a collaborative contract between the George Washington University and the Food and Drug Administration, the project has grown to include over 20 universities, biotechnology companies, public-private partnerships and pharmaceutical companies including Seven Bridges and Harvard Medical School. The BCO aims to ease the exchange of HTS workflows between various organizations, such as the FDA, pharmaceutical companies, contract research organizations, bioinformatic platform providers, and academic researchers. Due to the sensitive nature of regulatory filings, few direct references to material can be published. However, the project is currently funded to train FDA Reviewers and administrators to read and interpret BCOs, and currently has 4 publications either submitted or nearly submitted.

== Background ==
One of the biggest challenges in bioinformatics is documenting and sharing scientific workflows in such a way that the computation and its results can be peer-reviewed or reliably reproduced. Bioinformatic pipelines typically use multiple pieces of software, each of which typically has multiple versions available, multiple input parameters, multiple outputs, and possibly platform-specific configurations. As with experimental parameters in a laboratory protocol, small changes in computational parameters may have a large impact on the scientific validity of the results. The BioCompute Framework provides an object oriented design from which a BCO that contains details of a pipeline and how it was used can be constructed, digitally signed, and shared. The BioCompute concept was originally developed to satisfy FDA regulatory research and review needs for evaluation, validation, and verification of genomics data. However, the Biocompute Framework follows FAIR Data Principles and can be used broadly to provide communication and interoperability between different platforms, industries, scientists and regulators

== Utility ==
As a standardization for genomic data, BioCompute Objects are mostly useful to three groups of users: 1) academic researchers carrying out new genetic experiments, 2) pharma/biotech companies that wish to submit work to the FDA for regulatory review, and 3) clinical settings (hospitals and labs) that offer genetic tests and personalized medicine. The utility to academic researchers is the ability to reproduce experimental data more accurately and with less uncertainty. The utility to entities wishing to submit work to the FDA is a streamlined approach, again with less uncertainty and with the ability to more accurately reproduce work. For clinical settings, it is critical that HTS data and clinical metadata be transmitted in an accurate way, ideally in a standardized way that is readable by any stakeholder, including regulatory partners.

== Format ==
The BioCompute Object is in json format and, at a minimum, contains all the software versions and parameters necessary to evaluate or verify a computational pipeline. It may also contain input data as files or links, reference genomes, or executable Docker components. A BioCompute Object can be integrated with HL7 FHIR as a Provenance Resource. Multiple joint implementations are also under development that leverage BCO's report-centric format, including CWL (one of which is part of an active government funded public contract with a cofounder of CWL to pilot and generate documentation for a joint BCO-CWL, as well as examples) and RO.

== BCO Consortium ==
The BioCompute Object working group facilitated a means for different stakeholders to provide input on current practices on the BCO. This working group was formed during preparation for the 2017 HTS Computational Standards for Regulatory Sciences Workshop, and was initially made up of the workshop participants. The growth and work of the BCO working group, as a direct result of the interaction between a variety of stakeholders from all interested communities, culminated in the official standard, IEEE 2791-2020, which was approved in January 2020. A Public-Private partnerships was formed between GWU and CBER and has become an easy point of entry for new individuals or institutions into the BCO project to participate in the discussion of best practices for the objects.

== Implementations ==
The simple R package biocompute can create, validate, and export BioCompute Objects. The Genomics Compliance Suite is a Shiny app that offers similar features to regular expressions found in all modern text editors. There are several internally developed open source software packages and web applications that implement the BioCompute specification, three of which have been deployed in a publicly accessible AWS EC2 cloud. These include an instance of the High-performance Integrated Virtual Environment, the BioCompute Portal (a form-based web application that can create and edit BioCompute Objects based on the IEEE-2791-2020 standard, and a BioCompute compliant instance of Galaxy.

Some bioinformatics platforms have built-in support for Biocompute, which let a user automatically create a BCO from a workflow and edit the descriptive content.

- DNAnexus and PrecisionFDA facilitate the generation of BCOs by importing workflows, allowing users to edit descriptive content. The platform supports metadata import and export of WDL and CWL scripts, and offers the BCOnexus tool, which is a high-level, platform-free tool with a graphical user interface that lets a user merge BCOs.
- Velsera's Seven Bridges Genomics and Cancer Genomics Cloud also have support for BioCompute by enabling direct pre-population of BCO fields from workflows.
- BioCompute has also been integrated into HIVE and the main Galaxy instance, both of which similarly enable users to automatically generate BCOs and edit content within these platforms.
- BioCompute has also been implemented in the Common Fund Data Elements Playbook Partnership project. This implementation lets a user save a workflow when they're satisfied with the results, which aids in traceability through the network of independently-versioned resources, allowing users to save queries and annotate them for future use, sharing, or repeatability, aligning with its role in advancing bioinformatics practices.

Integration into platforms is meant to improve data handling and collaboration and provide effective ways for users to execute a workflow, and graphical representations of BCOs are often more intuitive ways of browsing or reading BCOs.
