= Edward A. Lee =

American computer scientist

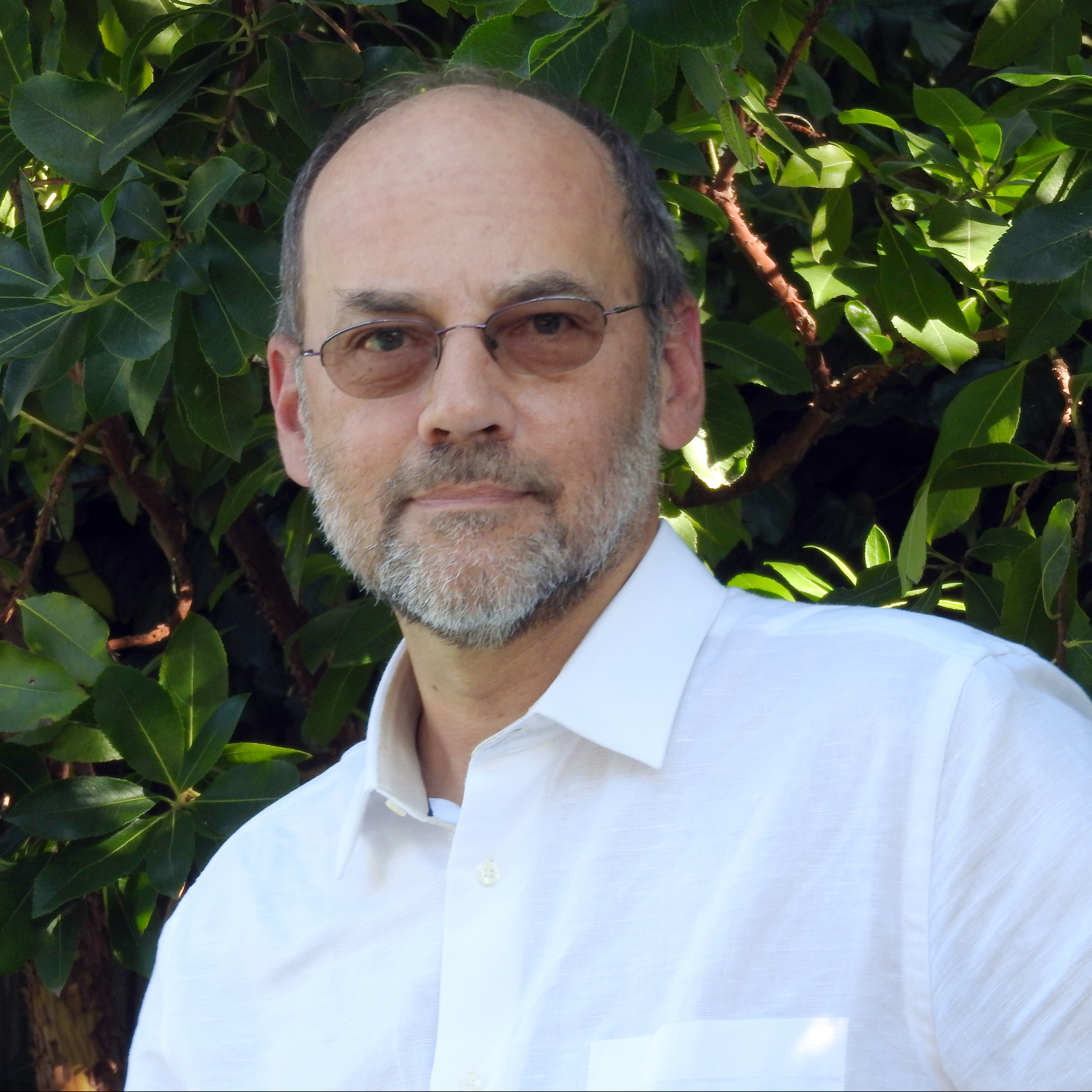
- Lee in 2018
- Born: Edward Ashford Lee; October 3, 1957 (age 68); San Juan, Puerto Rico
- Notable work: Plato and the Nerd (2017); Introduction to Embedded Systems (2017); Digital Communication (2004)
- Scientific career
- Education: Yale University; Massachusetts Institute of Technology; University of California, Berkeley
- Awards: The Berkeley Citation (2018), Outstanding Technical Achievement and Leadership Award from the IEEE Technical Committee on Real-Time Systems (TCRTS), Robert S. Pepper Distinguished Professorship (2006-2018), Frederick Emmons Terman Award for Engineering Education (1997), IEEE Fellow, NSF Presidential Young Investigator Award (1987)
- Fields: Computer Science, Electrical Engineering
- Workplaces: University of California, Berkeley
- Thesis: A Coupled Hardware and Software Architecture for Programmable Digital Signal Processors (1986)
- Doctoral advisor: David Messerschmitt
- Website: ptolemy.berkeley.edu/~eal/

Edward Ashford Lee (born October 3, 1957 in Puerto Rico) is an American computer scientist, electrical engineer, and author. He is Professor of the Graduate School and Distinguished Professor Emeritus in the Electrical Engineering and Computer Science (EECS) Department at UC Berkeley. Lee works in the areas of cyber-physical systems, embedded systems, and the semantics of programming languages. He is particularly known for his advocacy of deterministic models for the engineering of cyber-physical systems.

Lee has led the Ptolemy Project, which has created Ptolemy II, an open-source model based design and simulation tool. He ghost-edited a book about this software, where the editor of record is Claudius Ptolemaeus, the 2nd century Greek astronomer, mathematician, and geographer. The Kepler scientific workflow system is based on Ptolemy II.

From 2005 to 2008 Lee was chair of the Electrical Engineering Division and then chair of the EECS Department at UC Berkeley. He has led a number of large research projects at Berkeley, including the Center for Hybrid and Embedded Software Systems (CHESS), the TerraSwarm Research Center, and the Industrial Cyber-Physical Systems Research Center (iCyPhy).

Lee has written several textbooks, covering subjects including embedded systems, digital communications, and signals and systems. He has also published two general-audience books, Plato and the Nerd: The Creative Partnership of Humans and Technology and The Coevolution: The Entwined Futures of Humans and Machines (2020), where he examines the relationship between humans and technology.

== Biography ==
Lee was born in San Juan, Puerto Rico in 1957. His father, a prominent businessman and later a bankruptcy lawyer, was a descendant of notable Puerto Ricans Alejandro Tapia y Rivera, a poet and playwright, and Bailey Ashford, a pioneering physician in the treatment of tropical anemia. His mother was originally from Kentucky, but moved around the country many times following her career Army father, Charles P. Nicholas, a mathematician who worked on scientific intelligence during World War II (work for which he was twice awarded the Legion of Merit). Nicholas went on to serve as a member of the original organizing team for national Central Intelligence, and later moved to West Point, where he became head of the Math Department at the United States Military Academy.

At age 14, Lee left home to attend the Lawrenceville School, a boarding school in New Jersey. From there he went to Yale University, where he flitted between majors before settling on a double major in Computer Science and Engineering and Applied Science.

== Career ==
Lee began his career at Bell Labs (1979–1982), working on data communication technologies. After completing his doctorate, he joined UC Berkeley’s faculty in 1986, later serving as Chair of the EECS Department (2005–2008). He co-founded BDTI, Inc., a firm specializing in technology analysis, where he remains a Senior Technical Advisor. He also co-founded Xronos Inc., a firm specializing in software systems for mobility and robotics.

In 2018, Lee retired from teaching to focus full-time on research and writing.

As director of the Industrial Cyber-Physical Systems Research Center (iCyPhy) at Berkeley, Lee led interdisciplinary research into integrating physical systems with software and networks.

== Research ==
His work emphasizes deterministic models to address unpredictability in distributed systems, particularly for real-time applications. He developed Lingua Franca, a coordination language that uses logical timestamps to ensure determinism in distributed environments, and Ptolemy II, a modeling and simulation framework for heterogeneous systems.

Lee’s research bridges engineering and philosophy, exploring the interplay between humans and technology. His technical contributions include advancements in real-time systems, hybrid cosimulation standards, and secure architectures for the Internet of Things (IoT).

He introduced, together with Marten Lohstroh, the reactors model, a computational framework for designing predictable distributed systems, and advocated for timestamp-based coordination to enhance reliability in cyber-physical applications.

== Books ==
- The Coevolution: The Entwined Futures of Humans and Machines (2020)
- Plato and the Nerd: The Creative Partnership of Humans and Technology (2017)
- Introduction to Embedded Systems: A Cyber-Physical Systems Approach (2017)
- System Design, Modeling, and Simulation using Ptolemy II (2014)
- Digital Communication (1988, 1994, 2004)
- Structure and Interpretation of Signals and Systems (2003,2011)
- DSP Processor Fundamentals: Architectures and Features (1997)
- Software Synthesis from Dataflow Graphs (1996)

== Awards ==
- The 2023 CASES Test of Time Award for a paper published in 2008 on precision timed (PRET) machines.
- The 2022 European Design and Automation Association (EDAA) Achievement Award.
- The 2022 ACM SIGBED Technical Achievement Award.
- An honorary doctorate from the Technical University of Vienna in 2022.
- The 2019 IEEE Technical Committee on Cyber-Physical Systems (TCCPS) Technical Achievement Award.
- The Berkeley Citation, February, 2018.
- Outstanding Technical Achievement and Leadership Award from the IEEE Technical Committee on Real-Time Systems (TCRTS), 2016.
- Robert S. Pepper Distinguished Professorship, UC Berkeley, 2006.
- ASEE Frederick Emmons Terman Award, 1997.
- NSF Presidential Young Investigator Award, 1987.
- IEEE fellow in 1994 for contribution to design methodologies and programming techniques for real-time digital signal processing systems.
