= OnlineHPC =

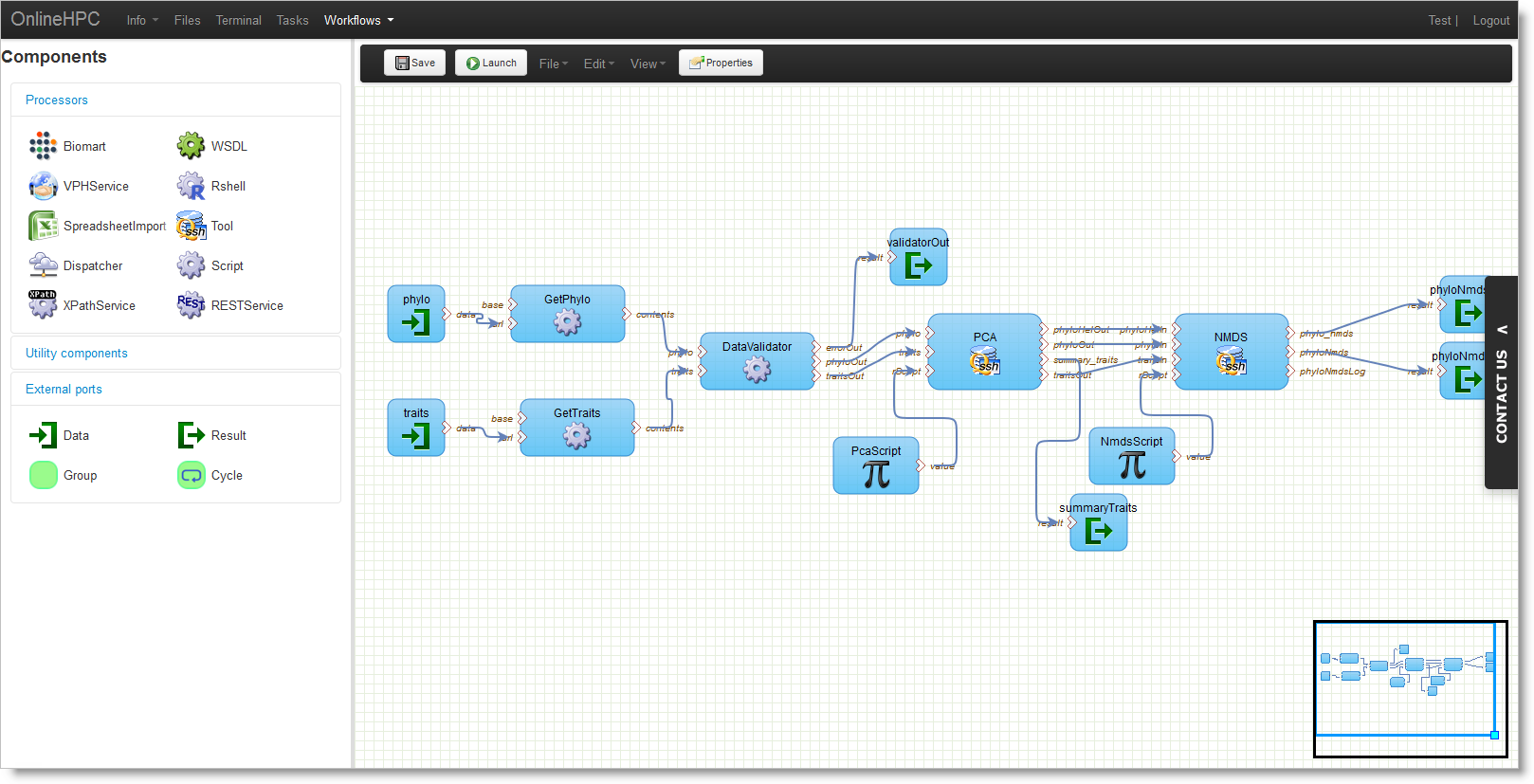
- OnlineHPC Workflow Designer
- Developer: OnlineHPC
- Final release: 1.0 / September 24, 2012
- Written in: Java
- Operating system: Linux, Mac OS X, Microsoft Windows
- License: Proprietary EULA
- Website: onlinehpc.com

The OnlineHPC was a free public web service that supplied tools to deal with high performance computers and online workflow editor. OnlineHPC allowed users to design and execute workflows using the online workflow designer and to work with high performance computers – clusters and clouds. Access to high performance resources was available as directly from the service user interface, as from workflow components. The workflow engine of the OnlineHPC service was Taverna as traditionally used for scientific workflow execution in such domains, as bioinformatics, cheminformatics, medicine, astronomy, social science, music, and digital preservation.

== History ==
OnlineHPC was started at the Institute for Information Transmission Problems in 2012 as a project for the institute’s researchers whose work need access to computer clusters and who are not professional programmers.

The project motivation is that there is a gap between researcher skills and competence level needed to run high performance computing. There are at least three barriers on the way to HPC:

- Researcher needs to find HPC provider and go through procedures to get access;
- Researcher needs to install and configure numerous low-level software applications and deal with digital certificates to proceed;
- Researcher needs to get familiar with such technologies and tools as MPI, batch task managers or even web services.

The last requirement stops majority of even the stoutest researchers that passed first two levels. The service aims to reduce the barriers by providing a complete pre-configured set of tools required for work with computer clusters: in-browser terminal emulator, files system browser, credentials manager and massive task tool.

After a while, it became obvious that engineering and scientific tasks require a more elaborate tool suit that enables researchers to execute the flow of tasks – workflows. Unless there is a number of scientific workflow implementations, they are almost all desktop applications and thus the aim was creating an online environment with a focus on simplicity and enhanced user experience.

The project was in use in bioinformatics, human health, telecommunications and other domains.

As of 2016-05, http://onlinehpc.com/ was unavailable.

== Capabilities ==
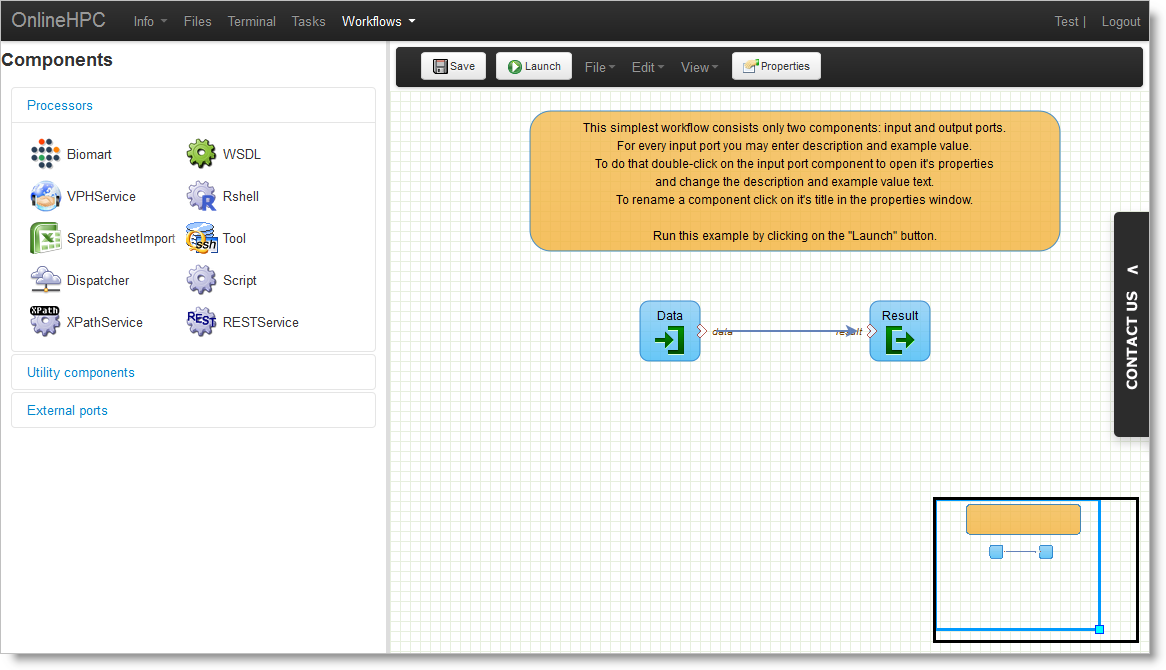
The OnlineHPC workflow designer screenshot

OnlineHPC had a workflow designer available online using major browsers (Firefox, Chrome and Internet Explorer) on desktops and tablets.

Workflows in OnlineHPC included components for:

- Running massive computations on computer clusters
- SOAP/WSDL and REST Web services, special component for the BioMart web service.
- R statistical service
- Beanshell script (Java-like script language)
- External tools on remote machines (via ssh)
- XPath xml data extraction
- Importing data from Microsoft Excel spreadsheets

The service also had basic tools to prepare and run massive computational tasks on clusters - in-browser terminal emulator, file system browser and cluster status viewer. Users could choose to operate existing hardware cluster or to start a configure a new cluster instance in the cloud.

== See also ==
- High performance computing
- e-Science
- Workflow
- Web services
- Bioinformatics workflow management systems
