= Consumer surplus for software products =

Consumer surplus for software products can be calculated differently from other products. Customers tend to buy products with greater consumer surplus. Software companies should know what measure in their market analysis to determine their consumer surplus so that create products that are better at fulfilling their customers. Messerschmitt and Szyperski have studied what factors affect the perceived consumer surplus in the software product market. The value a customer places on software is affected by things such as compatibility with complementary products, degree of adoption in the market, usability, increases in productivity, differentiation from competitors, and innovativeness. These can be customer satisfaction dimensions.

On the other hand, many things affect the total cost of ownership of software products besides price. These include implementation, training, management, and operations costs. Additionally, switching costs to competitors play a role because customers may fear that the vendor may discontinue the product or go out of business. These authors suggest that the price of software should be based on its consumer surplus. Pricing strategies can be used to gain the most revenue such as product bundling, forming separable modules, and price discrimination with product variants and target groups. (2004) Calculations of consumer surplus is one way that software firms can keep track of their perception by customers in an integrative way.
