= David Messerschmitt =

American engineer (born 1945)

- Born: May 21, 1945 (age 81); Denver, Colorado, US
- Education: University of Colorado Boulder (BS); University of Michigan (MS, PhD)
- Awards: IEEE Alexander Graham Bell Medal (1999); NAE (1990)
- Scientific career
- Fields: Electrical Engineering and Computer Sciences
- Workplaces: University of California, Berkeley
- Doctoral students: Edward A. Lee; Teresa Meng; Keshab K. Parhi; Shih-Fu Chang
- Website: www2.eecs.berkeley.edu/Faculty/Homepages/messerschmitt.html

David G. Messerschmitt (born May 21, 1945) is an American engineer and professor emeritus at the University of California, Berkeley in the Department of Electrical Engineering and Computer Sciences in the UC Berkeley College of Engineering. He retired from UC Berkeley in 2005. At present he is conducting research at Berkeley, is a visiting professor in the Software Business Laboratory at the Helsinki University of Technology, and is doing research on interstellar communications at the SETI Institute. Messerschmitt also serves on the Advisory Council of METI International.

== Biography ==
His notable past research includes the advancement of digital transmission systems, including contributions that made telephony possible over the existing telephone network, the use of VLSI to realize functions in the telephone network, and VLSI architectures to solve signal processing challenges. His work has increasingly been devoted to software. In 1984, Messerschmitt wrote Blosim, a software-based block diagram simulation system for digital signal processing simulations. He also contributed to a successor to Blosim called Ptolemy, which is still being actively developed and used. When the UC Berkeley School of Information was created he co-founded courses on network applications and strategic technology, and later served as interim dean of the school. His research interests and curriculum development for the past decade have been largely devoted to the business of software and economics of the software industry.

Messerschmitt graduated with a Bachelor of Science in electrical engineering from the University of Colorado Boulder in 1967, and received his Master of Science and Ph.D. in computer, information, and control engineering from the University of Michigan in 1971. He was a Bell Labs researcher until 1977, when he left to take an academic position at Berkeley.

In 1983, David Messerschmitt was elevated to the grade of Institute of Electrical and Electronics Engineers (IEEE) fellow for contributions to the theory of transmitting digital waveforms on band-limited channels.

In 1999, Messerschmitt received the IEEE Alexander Graham Bell Medal "for fundamental contributions to communications theory and practice, including VLSI for signal processing, and simulation and modeling software". He was elected a member of the US National Academy of Engineering in 1990 for contributions to telecommunication theory and practice and to engineering education.

In 2007, Messerschmitt co-founded the Software business community (SWBC) in cooperation with the Helsinki University of Technology.

== Books ==
- Honig, M. L.; David G. Messerschmitt (1984). Adaptive Filters: Structures, Algorithms and Applications (The International Series in Engineering and Computer Science). Springer. ISBN 0-89838-163-0.
- Messerschmitt, David G. (1999). Networked Applications: A Guide to the New Computing Infrastructure. Morgan Kaufmann. ISBN 1-55860-536-3.
- Messerschmitt, David G. (2000). Understanding Networked Applications: A First Course. Morgan Kaufmann. ISBN 1-55860-537-1.
- Barry, John R.; Edward A. Lee; David G. Messerschmitt (2003). Digital Communication: Third Edition. Springer. ISBN 978-0-7923-7548-7.
- Messerschmitt, David G.; Clemens Szyperski (2005). Software Ecosystem: Understanding an Indispensable Technology and Industry. The MIT Press. ISBN 978-0-262-63331-4.

Awards
Preceded by Richard Blahut	IEEE Alexander Graham Bell Medal; 1999	Succeeded by Vladimir Kotelnikov
