= Workflow technology =

Workflow technology is a field of software products designed to improve the design of information systems. It involves use of workflow engine, also known as an orchestration engine, to execute models of processes. The models can be edited by persons not experienced in programming (e.g. managers) using workflow editors.

== See also ==
- Workflow
- Workflow engine
- Workflow management system
- Workflow application
- Bioinformatics workflow management system
- Scientific workflow system
