= Guided analytics =

Guided analytics is a sub-field at the interface of visual analytics and predictive analytics focused on the development of interactive visual interfaces for business intelligence applications. Such interactive applications serve the analyst to take important decisions by easily extracting information from the data.

== Overview ==
Guided analytics applications lie in the intersection between business intelligence and predictive analytics. A great number of business analysts rely on business intelligence tools to flexibly extract specific information from data. It is often required to automatically run an analysis on the raw data before information can be extracted. However, it is not always possible to automate the entire process from any kind of raw data access to the extraction of useful information. Furthermore, the expertise of data scientists will be necessary each time new data or questions come into the picture. This is especially true when predictive analytics (machine learning) is applied.

To create an application that is flexible to different data problems and usable by the domain experts without continuous help by a data scientist, it is required to insert a number of interaction points in the analysis process. The interactions will determine the sequence of steps in the analysis. In this way, the application guides the user with no need of customization by the data science expert. Guided analytics is about building such interactive applications. By mixing and matching automation and interaction, guided analytics applications empower business analysts to independently extract insights and future outcomes from the data.

== History ==
The term “guided analytics” was coined for the first time in an online magazine by a TIBCO expert in 2004. Back then, predictive analytics in business intelligence was fairly new. Guided analytics applications were focused entirely on interactive visualization to ease the access to trustworthy KPI metrics through a database. This was seen particularly useful in the pharmaceutical industry.

In 2007, a paper published by IEEE Computer Society Press presented guided analytics as one of the future trends in business intelligence.

In 2012, one of the main visual analytics experts, Ben Shneiderman, is co-authored in a paper mentioning guided analytics among the “interactive dynamics for visual analysis”. A good quote from J. Heer and B. Schneirderman paper is “visual-analysis systems can incorporate guided analytics to lead analysts through workflows for common tasks”.

In 2016, vendors like Qlik and Tableau proposed guided analytics for exploratory data analysis tasks.

Around 2018, guided analytics was mentioned by business intelligence vendors when describing applications for advanced analytics use cases, rather than only for interactive dashboards. In fact, guided analytics can also be used in each phase of the CRISP-DM data science cycle.

In 2018 and 2019, KNIME has released a number of analytical blueprints for guided analytics workflows with a special focus on automated machine learning. KNIME proposed guided analytics as a key mechanism to abstract data science for other users.
