= Michael Berthold =

German computer scientist

Michael R. Berthold
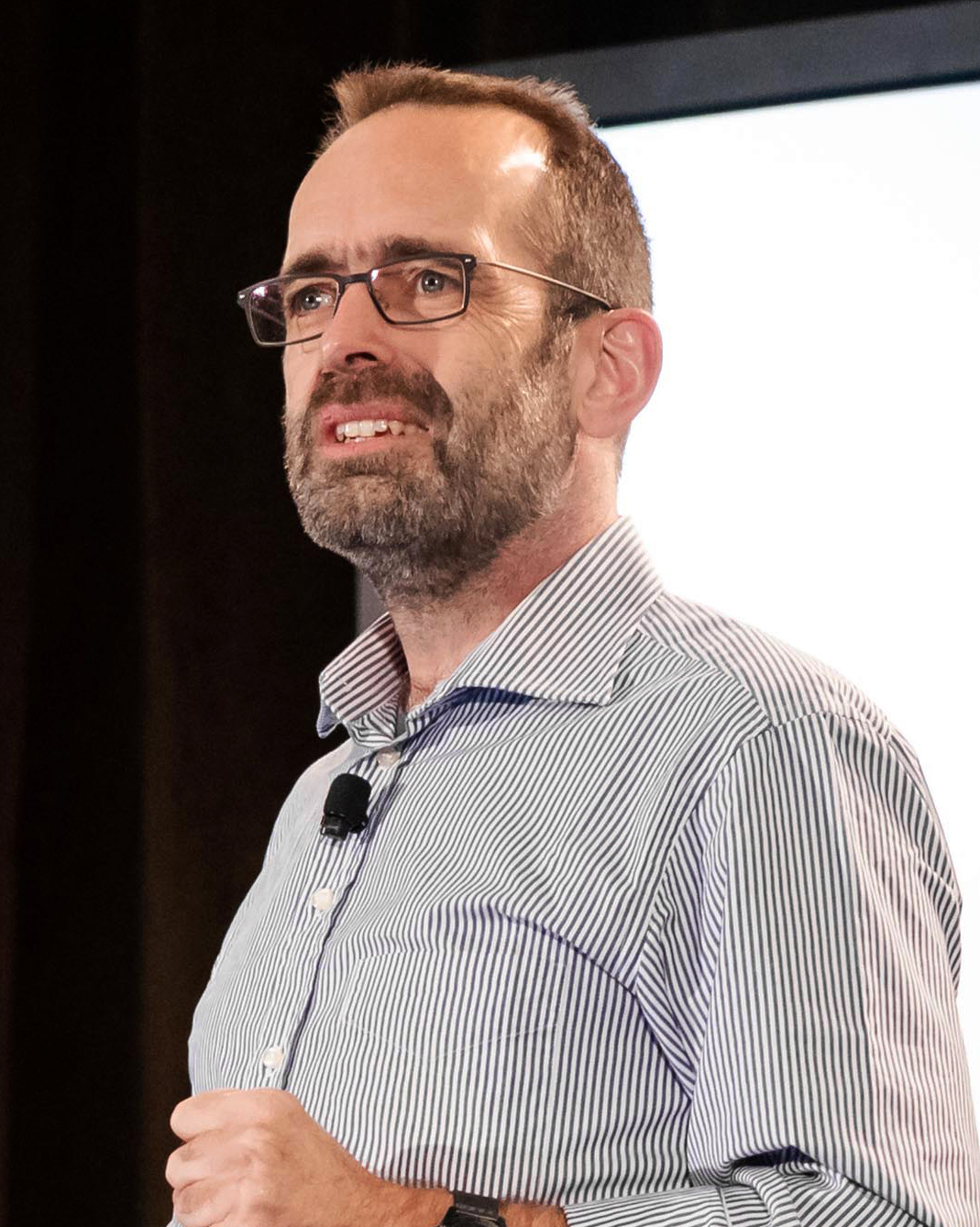
- Berthold presenting at the 2022 KNIME Fall Summit
- Occupations: Computer scientist, entrepreneur, and author
- Awards: KS Fu Award, the North American Fuzzy Information Processing Society; Fellow, The Institute of Electrical and Electronics Engineers (IEEE); Honorary Professor, Óbuda University, Budapest

Academic background
- Education: University of Karlsruhe, Germany

Academic work
- Institutions: Konstanz University, Germany

Michael R. Berthold is a German computer scientist, entrepreneur, academic and author. He held the chair for bioinformatics and information mining at Konstanz University, and is an honorary professor at Óbuda University. He is also the co-founder of KNIME, and was serving as a president and CEO of KNIME AG from 2017 to 2025.

Berthold has authored over 250 publications while focusing his research on the use of machine learning methods for the interactive analysis of large information repositories. He is the editor and co-author of textbooks, including, Guide To Intelligent Data Science, and Intelligent Data Analysis.

Berthold is a Fellow of the Institute of Electrical and Electronics Engineers (IEEE), the past president of the North American Fuzzy Information Processing Society, and past president of the IEEE Systems, Man, and Cybernetics Society. He is an associate editor of Data Mining and Knowledge Discovery (DMKD), Knowledge and Information Systems (KIS), Journal of Cheminformatics (JCIS), and International Journal of Computational Intelligence in Bioinformatics and Systems Biology (IJCIBSB). He has been involved in the organization of various conferences, most notably the IDA series of symposia on Intelligent Data Analysis.

== Early life and education ==
Berthold was born in 1966 in Stuttgart, Germany. He received his MSc degree in computer science in 1992, and his Dr.rer.nat. degree in 1997, both from Karlsruhe University.

He is a great-grandson of Prof. Gottfried Berthold, professor for botany at Göttingen University from 1887 until 1923.

== Career ==
Berthold started his academic career as a visiting researcher at Carnegie Mellon University in 1991. He then held appointments as a visiting researcher at the University of Sydney in 1994, and as a researcher at the University of Karlsruhe in 1993. From 1997 to 2000, he was a BISC Research Fellow and lecturer at the University of California, Berkeley. From 2003 until 2017, he was a full professor and chair for bioinformatics and information mining at Konstanz University, Germany, where he co-founded KNIME, together with three colleagues. From 2017 to 2025 he was full-time CEO at KNIME AG, Zurich, Switzerland.

At IEEE, Berthold served as a president of the IEEE System, Man, and Cybernetics Society from 2010 to 2011.

== Research ==
Berthold has focused his research on large and heterogeneous data sources, with a particular focus on methods from AI (rule learning, neural networks, fuzzy logic and general machine learning).

=== Fuzzy models ===
Berthold has published on methods to extract fuzzy models from data based on constructive methods to build probabilistic neural networks. He developed similar algorithms for the extraction of fuzzy rule models. He then extended those models beyond classification and invented algorithms to extract regression models, so-called fuzzy graphs from data automatically.

=== Bisociative knowledge discovery ===
At Konstanz University, Berthold initiated a European project (EU FP7 BISON) that focused on bisociative methods to create insights from diverse data sources. The consortium created an output summarized in the resulting edited volume Bisociative Knowledge Discovery.

=== Widening of machine learning algorithms ===
Berthold was the first to introduce the idea of widened machine learning, which draws on parallel resources to improve model accuracy rather than the usual focus on speed-up. He discussed a number of generic ways of tuning data mining algorithms while providing a series of experiments. Later on, he conducted an in-depth analysis of the concept of Widened Data Mining, which aims at reducing the impact of heuristics by exploring more than just one suitable solution at each step. In 2017, Berthold and his team proposed the bucket selector, a model-independent randomized selection strategy, with the capability to perform better than existing selection strategies in cases without a diversity measure.

=== Data science design patterns ===
In 2023, Berthold and his co-authors introduced the notion of visual design patterns for data science. The presented methods are using graph patterns, lending themselves naturally to the data flow paradigm underlying most data science tools.

== Awards and honors ==
- 2001 – KS Fu Award, North American Fuzzy Information Processing Society
- 2010 – Fellow, The Institute of Electrical and Electronics Engineers (IEEE)
- 2011 – honorary professor, Óbuda University, Budapest
- 2025 – Fellow, International Academy of Artificial Intelligence Sciences (AAIS)

== Bibliography ==
=== Selected books ===
- Advances in Intelligent Data Analysis – Reasoning about Data (1997) ISBN 978-3-540-40813-0
- Intelligent Data Analysis 2nd Edition (2007) 9783540430605
- Bisociative Knowledge Discovery (2012) ISBN 978-3-642-31830-6
- Guide To Intelligent Data Science (2020) ISBN 978-3-030-45573-6

=== Selected articles ===
- Berthold, M., & Diamond, J. (1994). Boosting the performance of rbf networks with dynamic decay adjustment. Advances in neural information processing systems, 7.
- Berthold, M. R., & Huber, K. P. (1998). Missing values and learning of fuzzy rules. International Journal of Uncertainty, Fuzziness and Knowledge-Based Systems, 6(02), 171–178.
- Berthold, M. R., & Huber, K. P. (1999). Constructing fuzzy graphs from examples. Intelligent Data Analysis, 3(1), 37–53.
- Eliceiri, K. W., Berthold, M. R., Goldberg, I. G., Ibáñez, L., Manjunath, B. S., Martone, M. E., ... & Carpenter, A. E. (2012). Biological imaging software tools. Nature methods, 9(7), 697–710.
- Berthold, M. R., Fillbrunn, A., & Siebes, A. (2021). Widening: using parallel resources to improve model quality. Data Mining and Knowledge Discovery, 35(4), 1258–1286.
- Berthold, M.R., Brookhart, D., Gerber, S., Hayasaka, S., Widmann, M. (2023). Towards Data Science Design Patterns. Advances in Intelligent Data Analysis XXI. IDA 2023. Lecture Notes in Computer Science, vol 13876. Springer.
