= Common Workflow Language =

Standard for computational data-analysis workflows

- The Common Workflow Language standards
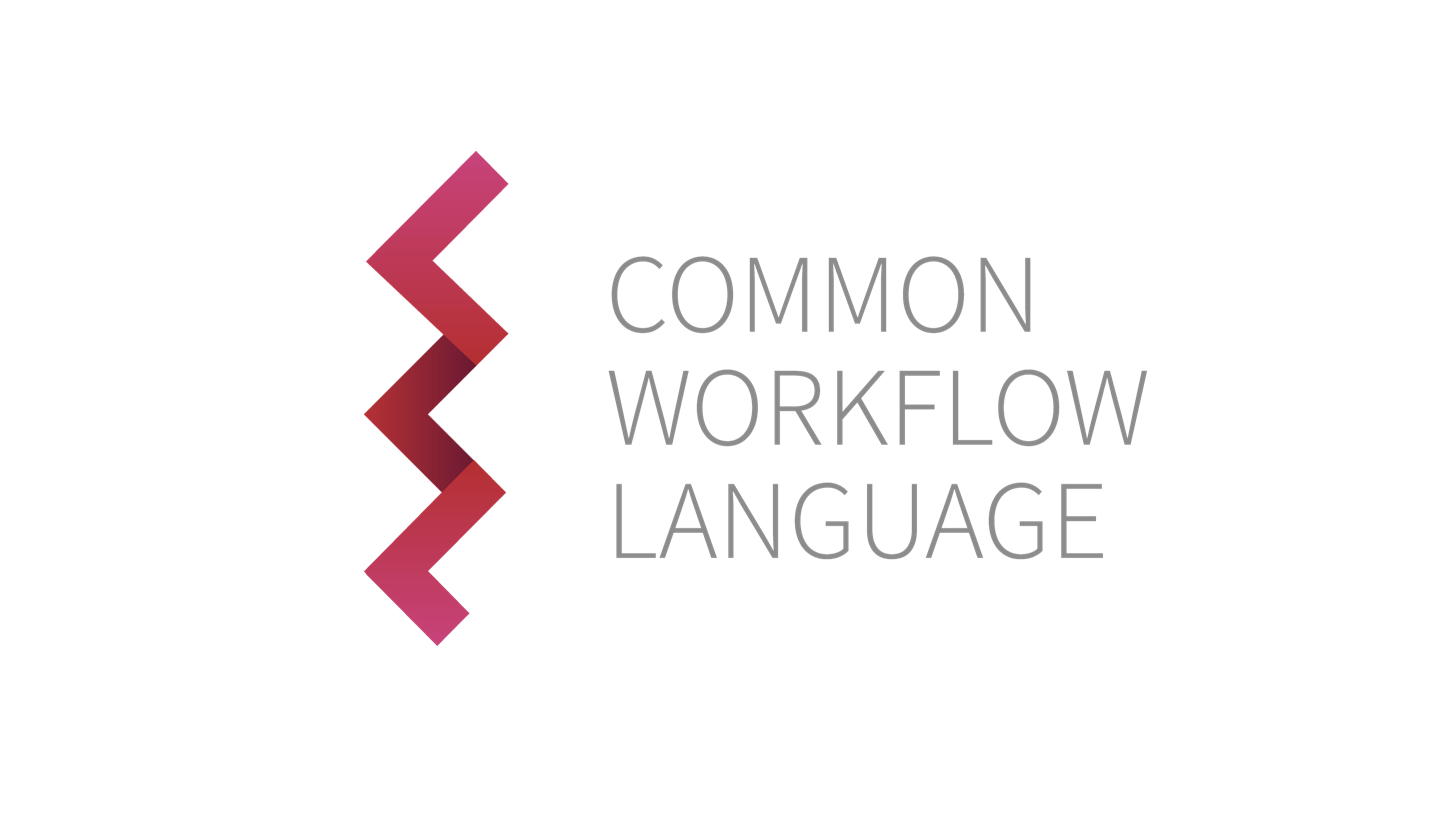
- CWL Logo
- Abbreviation: CWL
- Status: Published
- Year started: 10 July 2014
- Latest version: 1.2; 7 August 2020
- Related standards: BioCompute Object
- License: Apache 2.0
- Website: commonwl.org

The Common Workflow Language (CWL) is a standard for describing computational data-analysis workflows. Development of CWL is focused particularly on serving the data-intensive sciences, such as bioinformatics, medical imaging, astronomy, physics, and chemistry.

== Standard ==
A key goal of the CWL is to allow the creation of a workflow that is portable and thus may be run reproducibly in different computational environments.

The CWL originated from discussions in 2014 between Peter Amstutz, John Chilton, Nebojša Tijanić, and Michael R. Crusoe (at that time their respective affiliations were: Galaxy, Arvados, Seven Bridges, and Michigan State University) at the Open Bioinformatics Foundation BOSC 2014 codefest.

CWL is supported by multiple analysis runners and platforms such as Apache Airflow (via CWL-Airflow), Arvados, Rabix, Cromwell workflow engine, Toil, REANA - Reusable Analyses and CWLEXEC for IBM Spectrum LSF, and was identified in 2017 as one of the future trends for bioinformatics pipeline development. Several additional analysis environments are currently implementing support for CWL including Pegasus and Galaxy.

== Availability ==
The CWL Project is a multi-stakeholder working group consisting of both organizations and individuals. A member project of Software Freedom Conservancy, it publishes the CWL standards freely available via its GitHub repository under a permissive Apache License 2.0.
