= Swift (parallel scripting language) =

Parallel scripting language

- Paradigms: Dataflow, distributed, grid, concurrent, scientific workflow, scripting
- Developers: University of Chicago, Argonne National Laboratory
- First appeared: 2007; 19 years ago
- Stable release: 0.96.2 / August 5, 2015; 11 years ago
- Typing discipline: Strong
- Platform: Cross-platform: Java
- OS: Cross-platform: Java
- License: Apache 2.0
- Website: swift-lang.org

Influenced by
- C syntax, functional programming

Influenced
- Cuneiform

Swift is an implicitly parallel programming language that allows writing scripts that distribute program execution across distributed computing resources, including clusters, clouds, grids, and supercomputers. Swift implementations are open-source software under the Apache License, version 2.0.

== Language features ==
A Swift script describes strongly typed data, application components, invocations of applications components, and the interrelations in the dataflow between those invocations. The program statements will automatically run in parallel unless there is a data dependency between them, given sufficient computing resources. The design of the language guarantees that results of a computation are deterministic, even though the order in which statements executes may vary. A special file data type is built into Swift. It allows command-line programs to be integrated into a program as typed functions. This allows programmers to write programs that treat command-line programs and files in the same way as regular functions and variables. A concept of mapping is used to store and exchange complex data structures using a file system structure with files and directories.

Rapid dispatch of parallel tasks to a wide range of resources is implemented through a mechanism called Coasters task dispatch. A Message Passing Interface based implementation of the language supports very high task execution rates (e.g., 3000 tasks per second) on large clusters and supercomputers.

== Area of applications ==
Application examples:

- Energy modelling
- Climate modelling
- Economic modelling
- Biochemical protein modelling
- Magnetic resonance imaging (MRI) analysis in neuroscience
- Glass structure modelling

== See also ==
- Distributed computing
- Parallel computing
