= GenePattern =

American genomic data analysis software

- Developers: Broad Institute, University of California, San Diego
- Stable release: 3.9.11 rc4 b216 / May 2019
- Operating system: OS X 10.7 and later; Ubuntu, SuSE, CentOS
- Type: genomic analysis
- License: BSD
- Website: www.genepattern.org

GenePattern is a freely available computational biology open-source software package originally created and developed at the Broad Institute for the analysis of genomic data. Designed to enable researchers to develop, capture, and reproduce genomic analysis methodologies, GenePattern was first released in 2004. GenePattern is currently developed at the University of California, San Diego.

== Functionality ==
GenePattern is a powerful scientific workflow system that provides access to hundreds of genomic analysis tools. Use these analysis tools as building blocks to design sophisticated analysis pipelines that capture the methods, parameters, and data used to produce analysis results. Pipelines can be used to create, edit and share reproducible in silico results.

== Project Objectives ==
1. Accessibility: Run over 200 regularly updated analysis and visualization tools (that support data preprocessing, gene expression analysis, proteomics, Single nucleotide polymorphism (SNP) analysis, flow cytometry, and next-generation sequencing) and create analytic workflows without any programming through a point and click user interface.
2. Reproducibility: Automated history and provenance tracking with versioning so that any user can share, repeat and understand a complete computational analysis
3. Extensibility: Computational users can import their methods and code for sharing using tools that support easy creation and integration
4. Multiple interfaces: Web browser, application, and programmatic interfaces make analysis modules and pipelines available to a broad range of users; public hosted server

== Features ==
- A regularly updated repository of hundreds of computational analysis modules that support data preprocessing, gene expression analysis, proteomics, single nucleotide polymorphism (SNP) analysis, flow cytometry, and short-read sequencing.
- A programmatic interface that makes analysis modules available to computational biologists and developers from Python, Java, MATLAB, and R.
- The GenePattern Notebook Environment: Built on the Jupyter Notebook environment, GenePattern Notebook allows researchers to run GenePattern analyses within notebooks that interleave text, graphics, and executable code, creating a single "research narrative."
- GParc: Repository and community for GenePattern users to share and discuss their own GenePattern modules

== Availability ==
GenePattern is available:

1. As a free public web application, hosted on Amazon Web Services. Users can create accounts, perform analyses, and create pipelines on the server.
2. As open-source software that can be downloaded and installed locally.
3. Public web servers hosted by other organizations.
