= BioMart =

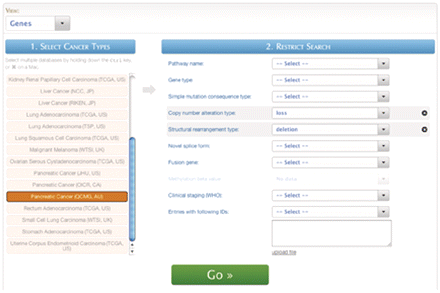
- BioMart QuickQuery Interface
- Written in: Java
- Operating system: Unix-like
- Available in: English
- Type: Federated database system
- License: LGPL
- Website: useast.ensembl.org/info/data/biomart/index.html

BioMart is a community-driven project to provide a single point of access to distributed research data. The BioMart project contributes open source software and data services to the international scientific community. Although the BioMart software is primarily used by the biomedical research community, it is designed in such a way that any type of data can be incorporated into the BioMart framework. The BioMart project originated at the European Bioinformatics Institute as a data management solution for the Human Genome Project. Since then, BioMart has grown to become a multi-institute collaboration involving various database projects on five continents.

== Integration with Ensembl ==
BioMart is a powerful tool for researchers and bioinformaticians that allows a user to export data from Ensembl, this could include data such as gene ID's, gene positions, associated variations, protein domains and sequences. BioMArt allows the data to be exported into convenient file types like FASTA, XLS, CSV, TSV, HTML. Researchers can use the exported data in a variety of applications, including genomic studies, gene expression analysis, and comparative genomics. BioMart's intuitive interface enables users to customize queries to access specific data sets or features of interest easily

== Software ==
BioMart is a freely available, open-source, federated database system that provides unified access to disparate, geographically distributed data sources. BioMart allows databases hosted on different servers to be presented seamlessly to users, facilitating collaborative projects. BioMart contains several levels of query optimization to efficiently manage large data sets, and offers a diverse selection of graphical user interfaces and application programming interfaces to allow queries to be performed in whatever manner is most convenient for the user. BioMart's capabilities are extended by integration with several widely used software packages such as Bioconductor, Galaxy, Cytoscape, and Taverna.

== Data sources and community ==
There are around 40 BioMart data sources including the Atlas of UTR Regulatory Activity (AURA), the COSMIC cancer database, Ensembl Genomes, HapMap, InterPro, Mouse Genome Informatics (MGI), Rfam and UniProt. Access is provided by institutions including the European Bioinformatics Institute (EBI) and the Wellcome Trust Sanger Institute in the UK, Cold Spring Harbor Laboratory and the National Center for Biotechnology Information (NCBI) in the United States and French National Centre for Scientific Research (CNRS). The BioMart Central Portal was established to provide a convenient single point of access to this growing pool of data sources.
