= List of open-source bioinformatics software =

This is a list of computer software which is made for bioinformatics and released under open-source software licenses with articles in Wikipedia.

Software	Description	Platform	License	Developer
.NET Bio	Language-neutral toolkit built using the Microsoft 4.0 .NET Framework to help developers, researchers, and scientists	.NET Framework	Apache	Collaborative project
AMPHORA	Metagenomics analysis software	Linux	GPL	Jonathan Eisen
Anduril	Component-based workflow framework for data analysis	Linux, macOS, Windows	GPL	University of Helsinki
Apache Taverna	Written in Java	Linux, macOS, Windows	Apache License 2.0	Apache Software Foundation, myGrid
Ascalaph Designer	Computer program for general purpose molecular modelling for molecular design and simulations.	Windows	GPLv2	Agile Molecule
AutoDock	Suite of automated docking tools	Linux, Mac OS X, SGI IRIX, and Windows	GPL	Scripps Research
Avogadro	C++ (Qt) based molecule editor and visualizer for in computational chemistry, molecular modeling, bioinformatics, materials science, and related areas.	Linux, macOS, Unix, Windows	3-Clause BSD License	Open Chemistry Project
BEDtools	"Genome arithmetic"—manipulation of coordinate sets and the extraction of sequences from a BED file.	Linux	MIT	QuinlanLab, University of Utah
Bioclipse	Visual platform for chemo- and bioinformatics based on the Eclipse Rich Client Platform (RCP)	Linux, macOS, Windows	Eclipse Public	The Bioclipse Project
Bioconductor	R (programming language) language toolkit	Linux, macOS, Windows	Artistic 2.0	Fred Hutchinson Cancer Research Center
BioJava	Java library functions for manipulating sequences, protein structures, file parsers, CORBA interoperability, Distributed Annotation System (DAS), access to AceDB, dynamic programming, and simple statistical routines	Linux, macOS, Windows	LGPL v2.1	Open Bioinformatics Foundation
BioJS	JavaScript library of components to visualize biological data	Web browser	Apache	BioJS Community
BioMOBY	Registry of web services	Web browser	Artistic	Open Bioinformatics Foundation
BioPerl	Perl language toolkit	Cross-platform	Artistic, GPL	Open Bioinformatics Foundation
BioPHP	PHP language toolkit with classes for DNA and protein sequence analysis, alignment, database parsing, and other bioinformatics tools	Cross-platform	GPL v2	Open Bioinformatics Foundation
Biopython	Python language toolkit	Cross-platform	Biopython	Open Bioinformatics Foundation
BioRuby	Ruby language toolkit	Linux, macOS, Windows	GPL v2 or Ruby	Open Bioinformatics Foundation
BLAST	Algorithm and program for comparing primary biological sequence information, including DNA and protein sequences.	Cross-platform	Public domain	National Center for Biotechnology Information
CP2K	Perform atomistic simulations of solid state, liquid, molecular and biological systems, written in Fortran 2003.	Linux, macOS, Windows	GPL and LGPL	Free open source GNU GPLv2 or later
cBioPortal	cBioPortal's primary goal is to make complex cancer genomic data accessible and interpretable for cancer biologists and clinicians by transforming multimodal data into interactive visualizations that facilitate biological discovery and clinical decision-making.	Web browser	AGPL	cBioPortal community
EMBOSS	Suite of packages for sequencing, searching, etc. written in C	Linux, macOS, Unix, Windows	GPL and LGPL	Collaborative project
Galaxy	Scientific workflow and data integration system	Unix-like	Academic Free	Collaborative project
GenePattern	Scientific workflow system that provides access to hundreds of genomic analysis tools	Unix-like (public server); Linux, macOS, Windows	MIT	Broad Institute, UC San Diego
Geworkbench	Genomic data integration platform	Linux, macOS, Windows	GeWorkbench License	Columbia University
GMOD	Toolkit to address many common challenges at biological databases	Unix-like (server), Web browser (client)	Varies depending on tool	Collaborative project
GenGIS	Application that allows combining digital map data with information about biological sequences collected from the environment	Windows, macOS	GPL	Collaborative project
GenoCAD	A computer-assisted design (CAD) tool for synthetic biology, used to design genetic constructs based on grammar rules.	Linux, macOS, Windows	Apache License 2.0	GenoCAD Team (Virginia Bioinformatics Institute)
Genomespace	Centralized web application that provides data format transformations and facilitates connections with other bioinformatics tools	Web browser	LGPL	Broad Institute, collaborative project
GENtle	An equivalent to the proprietary Vector NTI, a tool to analyze and edit DNA sequence files	Linux, macOS, Windows	GPL	Magnus Manske
gget	Efficient querying of genomic reference databases including UniProt, National Center for Biotechnology Information, and Ensembl genome database project	Linux, macOS, Windows	BSD	Laura Luebbert and Lior Pachter
GROMACS	Molecular dynamics package mainly designed for simulations of proteins, lipids and nucleic acids.	Linux, macOS, Windows	Common Public 1.0	GenoViz
Integrated Genome Browser	Java-based desktop genome browser	Linux, macOS, Windows	Common Public 1.0	GenoViz
InterMine	Extensive data warehouse system for the analysis and integration of biological datasets written in Java and JavaScript	Cross-platform	LGPL	University of Cambridge
LabKey Server	Software platform, allows organizations to integrate, analyze, and share complex biomedical data	Linux, macOS, Windows	Apache	LabKey Software Foundation
LAMMPS	Molecular dynamics program written in C++	Linux, macOS, Windows	Apache	Sandia National Laboratories.
mothur	Software for analysis of 16S rRNA gene amplicon sequence data	Linux, macOS, Windows	GPL	University of Michigan
Nextflow	A workflow management system used for building and running scalable and reproducible bioinformatics pipelines, especially in cloud and high-performance computing environments.	Linux, macOS, Windows	Apache License 2.0	Nextflow Team
PathVisio	Desktop software for drawing, analyzing, and visualizing biological pathways	Linux, macOS, Windows	Apache 2.0	Maastricht University
Orange	Component-based data mining and machine learning software suite written in C++, featuring a visual programming front-end for exploratory data analysis and interactive visualization, and Python bindings and libraries for scripting	Linux, macOS, Windows	GPL	University of Ljubljana
SAMtools	Utilities for interacting with high-throughput sequencing data and alignments in sam/bam format	Unix/Linux	MIT	Collaborative project
SOAP Suite	Suite of tools for assembly, alignment, and analysis of short read next generation sequencing data	Unix/Linux, macOS	GPL	BGI
Staden Package	Sequence assembly, editing, and analysis, mainly consisting of gap4, gap5, and spin. Written in C, C++, Fortran and Tcl.	Linux, macOS, Windows	BSD	Wellcome Trust Sanger Institute, Medical Research Council
Taverna workbench	Tool to design and execute workflows	Linux, macOS, Windows	LGPL	myGrid
Tracer	Open-source eBPF-based observability client for monitoring performance and resource usage in bioinformatics workflows.	Linux	Custom license (see GitHub)	Tracer Project GitHub
T-REX (web server)	Inference, validation and visualization of phylogenetic trees and phylogenetic networks	Web browser, Windows	GNU (GPL) v3	Université du Québec à Montréal
UGENE	Integrated bioinformatics tools, written in C++ (Qt)	Linux, macOS, Windows	GPL 2	Unipro
Unipept	Metaproteomics biodiversity analysis written in Ruby and JavaScript	Web browser	MIT	Ghent University
VOTCA	A Coarse-grained modeling package for molecular dynamics, written in C++, Perl, BASH	Linux, macOS, Windows, any other Unix variety	Apache License 2.0	Max Planck Institute for Polymer Research

== See also ==
- Comparison of software for molecular mechanics modeling
- Earth BioGenome Project
- List of sequence alignment software
- List of open-source healthcare software
- List of biomedical cybernetics software
- List of freeware health software
- List of genetic engineering software
- List of molecular graphics systems
- List of systems biology modelling software
- List of proprietary bioinformatics software
