= Outline of biotechnology =

Overview of and topical guide to biotechnology

The following outline is provided as an overview of and topical guide to biotechnology:

Biotechnology – field of applied biology that involves the use of living organisms and bioprocesses in engineering, technology, medicine and other fields requiring bioproducts. Biotechnology also utilizes these products for manufacturing purposes.

== Essence of biotechnology ==
- Bioengineering
  - Biochemical engineering
  - Genetic engineering
- Biology
  - Biochemistry
  - Bioinformatics
  - Genetics
  - Molecular biology
  - Systems biology
- Chemistry
- Technology

== Applications of biotechnology ==
- Antibiotics
- Antibody drug conjugates
- Assays
- Biocatalysis
- Biodegradable plastics
- Biofortification
- Biofuel
- Bioherbicides
- Biomarker discovery
- Biopesticides
- Biopharmaceuticals
- Biopolymers
- Bioprocessing
- Bioremediation
- Biosensors
- Cancer immunotherapy
- Carbon sequestration
- Cell therapy
- Cloning
  - Reproductive cloning
  - Therapeutic cloning
- CRISPR gene editing
- Drug development
- Environmental biotechnology
- Fermentation
- Gene therapy
- Genetic engineering
- Genetically modified food
- Medical tests
- Metablomics
- Monoclonal antibodies
- Personalized medicine
- Pharmacogenomics
- Plant tissue culture
- Protein engineering
- Proteomics
- Nanobiotechnology
- Recombinant DNA
- Regenerative medicine
- Stem cell therapy
- Synthetic biology
- Tissue engineering
- Use of biotechnology in pharmaceutical manufacturing
- Vaccines
- Wastewater treatment

== History of biotechnology ==
History of biotechnology

- Timeline of biotechnology
- Green Revolution

== General biotechnology concepts ==
- Bioeconomy
- Biomimetics
- Biotechnology industrial park
- Green Revolution
- Human Genome Project
- Pharmaceutical company
- Stem cell
- Telomere
- Tissue culture

== Biotechnology industry ==
- List of biotechnology companies

== Leaders in biotechnology ==
- Craig Venter
- David Baltimore
- Drew Weissman
- George Yancopoulos
- Jennifer Doudna
- Leonard Hayflick
- Michael D. West
- Robert Langer

== See also ==
- Index of biotechnology articles
- Earth BioGenome Project
- BioPerl, BioJava, BioJS, Biopython, BioRuby - libraries and modules that facilitate the development of bioinformatics applications.
- Nvidia Parabricks – Suite of free genome analysis software by Nvidia
