= List of bioinformatics journals =

This is a list of notable peer-reviewed scientific journals that focus on bioinformatics and computational biology.

- BioData Mining
- Bioinformatics
- Bioinformatics and Biology Insights
- BMC Bioinformatics
- Briefings in Bioinformatics
- Bulletin of Mathematical Biology
- Cancer Informatics
- Computational and Structural Biotechnology Journal
- Computational Biology and Chemistry
- Computers in Biology and Medicine
- Current Bioinformatics
- Database
- EMBnet.journal
- Evolutionary Bioinformatics
- GigaScience
- IEEE Transactions on Computational Biology and Bioinformatics
- Journal of the American Medical Informatics Association
- Journal of Bioinformatics and Computational Biology
- Journal of Biomedical Informatics
- Journal of Computational Biology
- Journal of Mathematical Biology
- Journal of Theoretical Biology
- PLOS Computational Biology
- Source Code for Biology and Medicine
- Statistical Applications in Genetics and Molecular Biology
- Statistics in Biosciences

== See also ==
- Lists of academic journals
- List of bioinformatics software

=== Bioinformatics conferences ===
- International Conference on Bioinformatics
- International Conference on Computational Intelligence Methods for Bioinformatics and Biostatistics
- Bioinformatics Open Source Conference
- European Conference on Computational Biology
- Research in Computational Molecular Biology
