= Earth BioGenome Project =

Initiative aimed at sequencing the genomes of all named eukaryotic species

- Duration: November 1, 2018 – 2028
- Website: www.earthbiogenome.org

The Earth BioGenome Project (EBP) is an initiative that aims to sequence and catalog the genomes of all of Earth's currently described eukaryotic species over a period of ten years. The initiative would produce an open DNA database of biological information that provides a platform for scientific research and supports environmental and conservation initiatives. A scientific paper presenting the vision for the project was published in PNAS in April 2018, and the project officially launched November 1, 2018.

The initiative was inspired by Human Genome Project, and emerged during November 2015 meeting between Harris Lewin (UCD), Gene E. Robinson (IGB) and W. John Kress (Smithsonian Institution's National Museum of Natural History). In February 2017, at major conference on genomics and biodiversity organized by the Smithsonian Institution and BGI in Washington, D.C. was supported project's 10-year plan and organizational structure.

== Summary ==
The project is projected to cost US$4.7 billion. It includes already ongoing projects, such as i5K (insects), B10K (birds), 10KP (plants), and the Darwin Tree of Life, which aims to sequence the estimated 66,000 eukaryotic species in the United Kingdom. The project is aiming to sequence and annotate the roughly 1.5 million known eukaryotic species in three phases, with first to create "annotated chromosome-scale reference assemblies for at least one representative species of each of the ~9,000 eukaryotic taxonomic families".

According to PNAS paper, several sequencing centers are supporting the project, including BGI (China), Baylor College of Medicine (USA), Wellcome Sanger Institute (UK), Rockefeller University (US), with an additional center to be established for the project in South America by São Paulo Research Foundation. As for bio-observatories which use genomics, examples which meet the project needs are National Ecological Observatory Network, Chinese Ecological Research Network, ForestGEO, and MarineGEO. To provide insight into the feasibility and technical requirements for "planetary scale" projects such as this, the 10,000 Plant Genome Project has published a pilot "Digitalization of Ruili Botanical Garden" project sampling and sequencing 761 vascular plant specimens growing in a Botanical Garden in South West China. As of October 2024, EBP has announced that there are genomes sequenced for 3,000 species from over 1,000 families, of which over 2,000 species from 750 families have chromosome-level assemblies. As the technology needed to generate high-quality reference genomes has improved and become increasingly globally accessible, there has been a need for coordination to standardise approaches and avoid duplication of effort. To address this the EBP has published their best-practice guidance for sample collection and processing.

== See also ==
- AlphaFold - deep learning protein folding
- BioPerl, BioJava, BioJS, Biopython, BioRuby - libraries and modules that facilitate the development of bioinformatics applications
- NVIDIA Parabricks – Suite of free genome analysis software by Nvidia
- Computational genomics
- List of sequenced eukaryotic genomes
- Earth Microbiome Project
- 1000 Plant Genomes Project
- 100,000 Genomes Project
- Human Genome Project
- All Species Foundation
- Encyclopedia of Life
- Wellcome Sanger Institute
