= Genostar =

French software company

- Company type: Privately held company
- Industry: Bioinformatics
- Founded: 2004; 22 years ago
- Headquarters: Grenoble, France
- Products: Software and Database
- Website: www.genostar.com

Genostar is a bioinformatics provider based in Grenoble, France. The company was founded in 2004 following the "Genostar consortium" that was created in 1999 as a public-private consortium by Genome Express, Hybrigenics, INRIA (Institut National de Recherche en Informatique et Automatique / French National Institute for Research in Computer Science and Control) and The Pasteur Institute.

== Software ==
Metabolic Pathway Builder is a bioinformatics environment dedicated to microbial research. This covers sequence assembly, mapping, annotation transfer and identification of protein domains, comparative genomics, structural searches, metabolic pathway analysis, modeling and simulation of biological networks. Genostar's software is platform independent and can thus be used for both Mac OS X, Windows, and Linux.

=== Sequence assembly ===
- Mapping an ensemble of sequences on a reference sequence
- between a reference sequence and contigs, between two sequences or between two sets of sequences
- finding of exact matches with minimum length using MUMmer
- detection of specific regions and SNPs
- creation of an assembled sequence relative to reference sequences

=== Genomic annotation ===
- Gene prediction: ab-initio gene prediction using a Hidden Markov model based method
- BlastX
- Automatic annotation transfer using BlastP

=== Proteic annotation ===
Metabolic Pathway Builder integrates several methods dedicated to proteic annotation:

- Pfam domain prediction using HMMER
- Several EMBOSS methods (antigenic, 2D structure prediction)

=== Expression Data Solution (EDS) ===
Genostar's Expression Data Solution (EDS) connects microarray data to genes, gene products and biochemical reactions, based on keywords and annotations. This software allows to:

- Assign expression values to the gene names and IDs
- Identify co-expressed genes and visually analyze the reactions and metabolic pathways in which they are involved
- Identify and perform analysis on co-regulated genes in terms of genomic localization, functional annotation and metabolism
- Colorize CDSs of interest in genomic maps according to their expression values and highlight the corresponding reactions in interactive metabolic KEGG maps
- Analyze the significance of functional data of a collection or sub-collection of CDSs (GO, KEGG and more): Fisher test
- Collect and visualize all functional data in exportable tables and maps

=== Database ===
Genostar's MicroB database consists of genomic, proteic, biochemical and metabolic data from approximately 1100 bacterial and archaeal organis.

== Partners ==
- INRIA (Institut National de Recherche en Informatique et Automatique / French National Institute for Research in Computer Science and Control)
- Swiss Institute of Bioinformatics
- ChemAxon
