= BioPHP =

- Original author: Dr. Joseba Bikandi
- Written in: PHP
- Platform: Cross-platform
- Type: Bioinformatics
- License: GNU GPL version 2
- Website: biophp.org

BioPHP is a collection of open-source PHP code, with classes for DNA and protein sequence analysis, alignment, database parsing, and other bioinformatics tools. BioRuby is released under the GNU GPL version 2 licence and is one of a number of Bio* projects, designed to reduce code duplication. As an open source bioinformatics project, BioPHP is affiliated with the Open Bioinformatics Foundation.

== History ==
The BioPHP project grew out of GenePHP, which was started by Serge Gregorio in 2003. GenePHP was conceived as a PHP-based implementation of similar bioinformatics packages such as BioPerl and BioPython and BioRuby. BioPHP was developed in December 2005 by Joseba Bikandi at the University of the Basque Country, Spain as an extension of GenePHP. GenePHP is one of the four projects currently forming BioPHP.

== Projects ==
BioPHP is divided into four 'projects'. The GenePHP project has a similar structure to other Bio* projects, with a number of classes representing (amongst other things) DNA and protein sequences and sequence alignments. Each class is designed to be general enough to be useful in a number of BioPHP projects. Similarly, the Functions project aims to create a number of functions to perform tasks on class objects and reduce code duplication between projects. The Minitools and Tools projects aim to generate a set of PHP scripts for small, repetitive tasks; scripts in the Tools project generally have special requirements, such as interfacing with non-PHP scripts and/or code (written in, for instance, Perl or C).

== See also ==
- Open Bioinformatics Foundation
