= Source Code for Biology and Medicine =

- Discipline: Bioinformatics
- Language: English
- Edited by: Emmanuel Ifeachor, Leif E. Peterson

Publication details
- History: 2006–2020
- Publisher: BioMed Central
- Frequency: Monthly

Standard abbreviations
- ISO 4: Source Code Biol. Med.

Indexing
- CODEN: SCBMCJ
- ISSN: 1751-0473
- LCCN: 2006243962
- OCLC no.: 74611691

Links
- Journal homepage; Online archive

Source Code for Biology and Medicine was a peer-reviewed open-access scientific journal in the field of bioinformatics, including information systems and data mining. The journal was published by BioMed Central and was established in 2006. The editors-in-chief were Emmanuel Ifeachor (University of Plymouth) and Leif E. Peterson (The Methodist Hospital Research Institute).

== Abstracting and indexing ==
The journal is abstracted and indexed in Chemical Abstracts Service, EmBiology, and Scopus.
