= Mothur =

Open source software used in bioinformatics to process DNA sequences

mothur
- Original author: Dr. Patrick Schloss et al
- Initial release: February 13, 2009; 16 years ago
- Stable release: v1.48.0 / May 18, 2022; 3 years ago
- Repository: github.com/mothur/mothur/
- Written in: C++
- Operating system: Windows, source available for Unix-like
- Size: 10.60 MB (Windows) to 12.50 MB (MacOS)
- Available in: English
- Type: Bioinformatics software
- License: GNU GPL v3
- Website: www.mothur.org

mothur is an open source software package for bioinformatics data processing. The package is frequently used in the analysis of DNA from uncultured microbes. mothur is capable of processing data generated from several DNA sequencing methods including 454 pyrosequencing, Illumina HiSeq and MiSeq, Sanger, PacBio, and IonTorrent. The first release of mothur occurred in 2009. The release of mothur was announced in a publication in the journal Applied and Environmental Microbiology. As of October 26, 2022 the article releasing mothur had been cited by around 15,000 other research studies.
