= MitoMap =

Haplotyping protocol

- Company type: Real Time Sequencing
- Industry: Genomics and R&D
- Founded: Delhi, India (2013)
- Founder: NGBT Conference
- Headquarters: Delhi, India
- Website: mitomap.sgrf.org.in

MitoMap is a real time haplotyping protocol that analyzes pathogenic variants that cause several mitochondrial diseases. It was carried out real-time for the first time during the 2013 NexGen Genomics & Bioinformatics Technologies conference at Delhi, India from November 14–16. The results have been published online.
