= Genomespace =

GenomeSpace
- Developer: Broad Institute
- Stable release: beta 5.0 / April 2012; 13 years ago
- Operating system: Cross-platform
- Platform: Web browser
- Available in: English
- License: LGPL 2.1
- Website: www.genomespace.org

GenomeSpace is an environment for genomics software tools and applications. It helps users manage their analysis workflows involving multiple diverse tools, including web applications and desktop tools and facilitates the transfer of data between tools via automatic format conversion. Analyses can use data from local or cloud-based stores.

GenomeSpace consists of a web-based user interface (UI) for users, and both a representational state transfer (RESTful) application programming interface (API) and a Java-based client development kit (CDK) for developers integrating their applications with GenomeSpace.

== GenomeSpace tools ==
GenomeSpace is linked with several tools and data sources for genomics analysis: Cytoscape, Galaxy, GenePattern, Genomica, geWorkbench, InSilico DB, the Integrative Genomics Viewer (IGV), and the UCSC Genome Browser. These programs provide a wide variety of genomic analyses, including network analysis and visualization, sequence analysis, whole-genome analysis, general statistical methods, gene expression analysis, proteomics, flow cytometry, next-generation sequence analysis, and genomic datasets. Developers of other genomics software can use the GenomeSpace API to add their tools.

== Collaborators ==
The GenomeSpace project is a collaboration of the Mesirov and Regev laboratories at the Broad Institute; the Chang laboratory at Stanford University; the Ideker laboratory at the University of California, San Diego; the Nekrutenko laboratory at Pennsylvania State University; the Segal laboratory at the Weizmann Institute of Science; and the Haussler and Kent laboratories at the University of California, Santa Cruz. GenomeSpace is funded by the National Human Genome Research Institute of the National Institutes of Health.
