= Computational and Structural Biotechnology Journal =

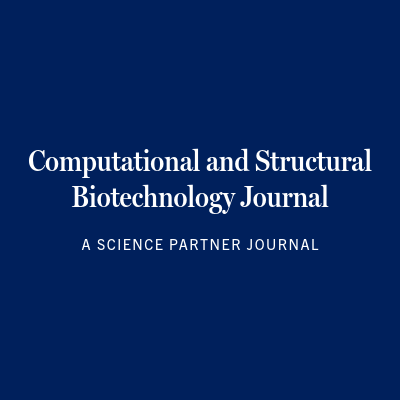
- Discipline: Computational and structural biology
- Language: English
- Edited by: Gianni Panagiotou

Publication details
- History: Since 2012
- Publisher: American Association for the Advancement of Science on behalf of Research Networks
- Open access: Yes
- License: Creative Commons Attribution
- Impact factor: 4.8 (2025)

Standard abbreviations
- ISO 4: Comput. Struct. Biotechnol. J.

Indexing
- CODEN: CSBJAC
- ISSN: 2001-0370
- OCLC no.: 922666427

Links
- Journal homepage; Previous homepage; Online archive

The Computational and Structural Biotechnology Journal is a peer-reviewed open-access scientific journal, published as part of the Science Partner Journal (SPJ) program of the American Association for the Advancement of Science. The journal was published by Elsevier on behalf of the Research Networks until 2025, covering all aspects of computational and structural biology. It was established in 2012, and the editor-in-chief is Gianni Panagiotou (Hans Knöll Institute).

== Sections ==
The journal is organized into subject-specific sections:

- General
- Smart Hospital
- Nanoscience & Advanced Materials
- Quantum Biology & Biophotonics

== Abstracting and indexing ==
The journal is abstracted and indexed in Chemical Abstracts Service, Global Health, Proquest databases, Science Citation Index Expanded, CAB International, MEDLINE/PubMed, Inspec, and Scopus.

According to the Journal Citation Reports, the journal has a 2025 impact factor of 4.8.
