= Open Bioinformatics Foundation =

The Open Bioinformatics Foundation is a non-profit, volunteer-run organization focused on supporting open source programming in bioinformatics. The mission of the foundation is to support the development of open source toolkits for bioinformatics, organise developer-centric hackathon events and generally assist in the development and promotion of open source software development in the life sciences. The foundation also organises and runs the annual Bioinformatics Open Source Conference, a satellite meeting of the Intelligent Systems for Molecular Biology conference.

The foundation regularly participates in the Google Summer of Code, acting as an umbrella organisation for individual bioinformatics-related projects. It also runs an "Event Fellowship" program to support researchers to attend in-person or online events. The program is particularly focused on enabling attendance for researchers from underrepresented groups.

The Open Bioinformatics Foundation was started in 2001, arising from the BioJava, BioPerl and BioPython projects. A formal membership for the foundation was created in 2005. In October 2012, the foundation began an association with Software in the Public Interest (SPI), a US-based non-profit which aids other organizations in the creation and distribution of free and open-source software. The association with SPI allows financial donations to the foundation (these are 501(c)3 tax-exempt in the US).

The foundation is governed by a board of directors, representing various Bio* projects. As of 2019, the OBF President is Peter Cock (BioPython). Previous OBF presidents include Ewan Birney and Hilmar Lapp (NESCent), previous Board members include Steven E. Brenner.

== Projects ==
The foundation hosts servers for mailing lists, websites, and code repositories for a number of bioinformatics-related open source projects, including:

- BioJava – Java toolkit
- BioMOBY – Data and application execution through web services
- BioPerl – Perl toolkit
- BioPython – Python toolkit
- BioRuby – Ruby toolkit
- BioPHP
- EMBOSS – Sequence analysis toolkit.

== See also ==
- List of open-source bioinformatics software
- Generic Model Organism Database
