= Statistics in Biosciences =

- Discipline: Statistics
- Language: English
- Edited by: Hongzhe Li, Mei-Cheng Wang

Publication details
- History: 2009-present
- Publisher: Springer Science+Business Media
- Frequency: 3/year

Standard abbreviations
- ISO 4: Stat. Biosci.

Indexing
- ISSN: 1867-1764 (print); 1867-1772 (web)

Links
- Journal homepage; Online archive

Statistics in Biosciences is a triannual peer-reviewed academic journal published by Springer Science+Business Media. It is the official journal of the International Chinese Statistical Association. It covers the development and application of statistical methods and their interface with other quantitative methods, such as computational and mathematical methods, in biological and life science, health science, and biopharmaceutical and biotechnological science. The journal publishes scientific papers in four formats: original articles, case studies and practice articles, review articles, and commentaries.

== Abstracting and indexing ==
The journal is abstracted and indexed in the Emerging Sources Citation Index, Research Papers in Economics, and Scopus,
