= GeWorkbench =

Genomic data analysis software

geWorkbench
- Developer(s): Columbia University, First Genetic Trust; National Cancer Institute
- Initial release: 2004; 21 years ago
- Stable release: 2.6.0.3 / December 21, 2016; 8 years ago
- Operating system: Windows, Linux, Mac OS X
- Platform: x86
- Available in: English
- Type: Genome data analysis
- License: BSD-like
- Website: www.geworkbench.org

geWorkbench (genomics Workbench) is an open-source software platform for integrated genomic data analysis. It is a desktop application written in the programming language Java. geWorkbench uses a component architecture. As of 2016, there are more than 70 plug-ins available, providing for the visualization and analysis of gene expression, sequence, and structure data.

geWorkbench is the Bioinformatics platform of MAGNet, the National Center for the Multi-scale Analysis of Genomic and Cellular Networks, one of the 8 National Centers for Biomedical Computing funded through the NIH Roadmap (NIH Common Fund). Many systems and structure biology tools developed by MAGNet investigators are available as geWorkbench plugins.

== Features ==
- Computational analysis tools such as t-test, hierarchical clustering, self-organizing maps, regulatory network reconstruction, BLAST searches, pattern-motif discovery, protein structure prediction, structure-based protein annotation, etc.
- Visualization of gene expression (heatmaps, volcano plot), molecular interaction networks (through Cytoscape), protein sequence and protein structure data (e.g., MarkUs).
- Integration of gene and pathway annotation information from curated sources as well as through Gene Ontology enrichment analysis.
- Component integration through platform management of inputs and outputs. Among data that can be shared between components are expression datasets, interaction networks, sample and marker (gene) sets and sequences.
- Dataset history tracking - complete record of data sets used and input settings.
- Integration with 3rd party tools such as GenePattern, Cytoscape, and Genomespace.

Demonstrations of each feature described can be found at GeWorkbench-web Tutorials.

== Versions ==
- geWorkbench is open-source software that can be downloaded and installed locally. A zip file of the released version Java source is also available.
- Prepackaged installer versions also exist for Windows, Macintosh, and Linux.
