= BioJS =

- Release: 2012
- Written in: JavaScript
- Type: Bioinformatics
- License: Apache 2
- Website: biojs.net
- Repository: github.com/biojs/biojs

BioJS is an open-source project for bioinformatics data on the web. Its goal is to develop an open-source library of JavaScript components to visualise biological data. BioJS develops and maintains small building blocks (components) which can be reused by others. For a discovery of available components, BioJS maintains a registry.

== History ==
The first version of BioJS was released in 2012 by John Gomez Carvajal. It was developed as a JavaScript library of web components to represent biological data in web applications. Version 2.0 included a complete redesign of the library and was released in 2014 as a Google Summer of Code project led by Manuel Corpas and developed by David Dao and Sebastian Wilzbach. Since then over 100 people contributed to the project. Currently more than 150 components are available in the BioJS registry.

== Selected list of published components ==
- DAG Viewer
- DNA Content Viewer
- FeatureViewer
- HeatMapViewer
- Intermine analysis
- Intermine endpoints
- KEGGViewer
- PPI-Interactions
- PsicquicGraph
- Sequence
- wigExplorer
- treeWidget

== Institutions using BioJS ==
- EBI
- ELife
- InterMine
- Berkeley Lab
- OpenPHACTS
- Rostlab
- TGAC

== Current status ==
As of 2022, the BioJS project's GitHub organization repositories, including the frontend for the component registry, had been archived by their owners and marked read-only, indicating the project is no longer actively maintained. In a 2019 GitHub issue thread, a project contributor confirmed to a prospective contributor that "the BioJS project is now archived and no longer maintained." Other repositories in the BioJS GitHub organization, such as the generator-biojs-webcomponents scaffolding tool and the original registry-ui, were likewise archived in 2021 and 2018 respectively.

== See also ==
- BioJava, Biopython, BioRuby, BioPHP, BioPerl, Bioconductor
- Open Bioinformatics Foundation
