= BioSense =

CDC medical surveillance program

BioSense is a program of the Centers for Disease Control and Prevention (CDC) that tracks health problems as they evolve and provides public health officials with the data, information and tools they need to understand developing health events. The system uses reports from local hospitals to conduct syndromic surveillance and identify trends in disease. The system began development in 2003. Its intended purpose was as an integrated nationwide health surveillance system to catch disease outbreaks and bioterrorism events such as the anthrax scare were key motivations for its development. It has faced criticism from congress and local health authorities over its cost and utility. Moreover, early versions of the system lacked uptake in part due to reluctance of hospital leaders to provide information directly to the government. Regardless, these systems have proved useful in monitoring the health effects of natural disasters, widespread outbreaks and monitoring epidemiological data on a national scale. More recently the system has also been used to monitor the effects of lifestyle such as vaping induced acute lung injuries.

Following these critiques, efforts have been made to improve BioSense. By integrating local and state-level information, CDC aims to integrate (i.e., multistate) and national levels and improve BioSense's utility. The key components of the BioSense program redesign are to:

- Help build health monitoring infrastructure and workforce capacity where needed at the state, local, tribal, and territorial levels
- Facilitate the interchange of information that can be used to coordinate responses and monitor health-related outcomes routinely and during an event
- Retain the original purpose of BioSense to detect and characterize events (or health-related threats) early by building on state and local health departments systems and programs
- Expand the utility of BioSense data to multi-use [and all-hazard] beyond early event detection and to contribute information for public health situational awareness, routine public health practice, and improved health outcomes and public health
- Improve the ability to detect emergency health-related threats by supporting the enhancement of systems to signal alerts for potential problems
- Increasing local and state jurisdictions participation in BioSense

== BioSense mandate and establishment ==
Mandated in the Public Health Security and Bioterrorism Preparedness Response Act of 2002, the CDC BioSense Program was launched in 2003 to establish an integrated national public health surveillance system for early detection and rapid assessment of potential bioterrorism-related illness.

== BioSense 2.0 ==
By November 2011, the Redesigned BioSense (or BioSense 2.0) will develop a community-controlled environment (architecturally distributed in a cloud-based model) governed by the Association of State and Territorial Health Officials (ASTHO), in coordination with the Council of State and Territorial Epidemiologists (CSTE), National Association of County and City Health Officials (NACCHO), and International Society for Disease Surveillance (ISDS). ASTHO will offer this service to states for receiving and managing syndromic surveillance information.

The cloud-based BioSense 2.0 environment allows State and Local health departments to access data that will support potential expansions of their syndromic surveillance systems under the Meaningful Use program. States that elect to use this utility will each have a secure "zone" that they control and can use to manage or share their syndromic surveillance information.
