= EMBOSS =

Open source software analysis package

- Written in: C
- Available in: English
- Type: Bioinformatics tool
- License: GNU General Public Licence
- Website: emboss.open-bio.org

EMBOSS is a free c software analysis package developed for the needs of the molecular biology and bioinformatics user community. The software automatically copes with data in a variety of formats and even allows transparent retrieval of sequence data from the web. Also, as extensive libraries are provided with the package, it is a platform to allow other scientists to develop and release software in true open source spirit. EMBOSS also integrates a range of currently available packages and tools for sequence analysis into a seamless whole.

EMBOSS is an acronym for European Molecular Biology Open Software Suite. The European part of the name hints at the wider scope. The core EMBOSS groups are collaborating with many other groups to develop the new applications that the users need. This was done from the beginning with EMBnet, the European Molecular Biology Network. EMBnet has many nodes worldwide most of which are national bioinformatics services. EMBnet has the programming expertise. In September 1998, the first workshop was held, when 30 people from EMBnet went to Hinxton to learn about EMBOSS and to discuss the way forward.

The EMBOSS package contains a variety of applications for sequence alignment, rapid database searching with sequence patterns, protein motif identification (including domain analysis), and much more.

The AJAX and NUCLEUS libraries are released under the GNU Library General Public Licence. EMBOSS applications are released under the GNU General Public Licence.

== EMBOSS application groups ==
Group	Description
Acd	Acd file utilities
Alignment consensus	Merging sequences to make a consensus
Alignment differences	Finding differences between sequences
Alignment dot plots	Dot plot sequence comparisons
Alignment global	Global sequence alignment
Alignment local	Local sequence alignment
Alignment multiple	Multiple sequence alignment
Display	Publication-quality display
Edit	Sequence editing
Enzyme kinetics	Enzyme kinetics calculations
Feature tables	Manipulation and display of sequence annotation
HMM	Hidden markov model analysis
Information	Information and general help for users
Menus	Menu interface(s)
Nucleic 2d structure	Nucleic acid secondary structure
Nucleic codon usage	Codon usage analysis
Nucleic composition	Composition of nucleotide sequences
Nucleic CpG islands	CpG island detection and analysis
Nucleic gene finding	Predictions of genes and other genomic features
Nucleic motifs	Nucleic acid motif searches
Nucleic mutation	Nucleic acid sequence mutation
Nucleic primers	Primer prediction
Nucleic profiles	Nucleic acid profile generation and searching
Nucleic repeats	Nucleic acid repeat detection
Nucleic restriction	Restriction enzyme sites in nucleotide sequences
Nucleic RNA folding	RNA folding methods and analysis
Nucleic transcription	Transcription factors, promoters and terminator prediction
Nucleic translation	Translation of nucleotide sequence to protein sequence
Phylogeny consensus	Phylogenetic consensus methods
Phylogeny continuous characters	Phylogenetic continuous character methods
Phylogeny discrete characters	Phylogenetic discrete character methods
Phylogeny distance matrix	Phylogenetic distance matrix methods
Phylogeny gene frequencies	Phylogenetic gene frequency methods
Phylogeny molecular sequence	Phylogenetic molecular sequence methods
Phylogeny tree drawing	Phylogenetic tree drawing methods
Protein 2d structure	Protein secondary structure
Protein 3d structure	Protein tertiary structure
Protein composition	Composition of protein sequences
Protein motifs	Protein motif searches
Protein mutation	Protein sequence mutation
Protein profiles	Protein profile generation and searching
Test	Testing tools, not for general use
Utils database creation	Database installation
Utils database indexing	Database indexing
Utils misc	Utility tools

== See also ==
- Open Bioinformatics Foundation
- Soaplab - A SOAP web service interface including EMBOSS
- Genostar - Integration of some of EMBOSS tools in a graphical application
