= Bioinformatics Open Source Conference =

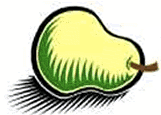
- BOSC Logo
- Frequency: Annually
- Locations: Madison, United States (2022)
- Years active: 26
- Previous event: BOSC 2025
- Next event: BOSC 2026
- Attendance: ~100
- Organiser: Nomi L. Harris, Karsten Hokamp (2021 chairs)
- Member: Open Bioinformatics Foundation
- Website: www.open-bio.org

The Bioinformatics Open Source Conference (BOSC) is an academic conference on open-source programming and other open science practices in bioinformatics, organised by the Open Bioinformatics Foundation. The conference has been held annually since 2000 and is run as a two-day meeting either within Intelligent Systems for Molecular Biology (ISMB) conference or as a joint conference with the Galaxy community.

== Program ==
The conference is held as a single track consisting of presentations, poster sessions and two keynote talks by people of influence in open-source bioinformatics.

Since 2010, an informal two-day "CollaborationFest" (formerly Codefest) has been held directly preceding the conference.

== History ==
National Institutes of Health Associate Director for Data Science Philip Bourne and C. Titus Brown gave keynote talks at BOSC 2014.

BOSC 2016 was organized in Orlando, Florida from July 8–9 before the main ISMB conference.

In 2018 and 2020, BOSC partnered with Galaxy to organize two joint conferences called GCCBOSC and Bioinformatics Community Conference (BCC) respectively. The event in 2018 was held in Portland, Oregon. The BCC in 2020 took place online with two time schedules for eastern/western time zones

Since 2021, BOSC has been taking place within the ISMB conferences again. In 2023 BOSC took place in Lyon, France between July 24–28 as part of the ISMB/ECCB conference.

== BOSC 2024 ==
The BOSC 2024 conference was a part of the Intelligent Systems for Molecular Biology Conference of 2024. The 2024 event also marked the 25th anniversary of the conference, which took place in Montreal, Canada.

The conference was held in a hybrid setting, with around 200 live attendees and the rest watching live. The conference covered a wide variety of topics, with the main theme focusing on approaches to using Artificial intelligence (AI) and Machine learning (ML) in Bioinformatics.

=== Keynote Speakers ===
The conference featured two keynote speakers.

One of them, Dr. Mélanie Courtot, gave a presentation titled "The Data Shows We Need Better Data" on day one of the conference. During her speech, she introduced the TRUE principles for preparing data for AI tools.

The next keynote speaker to present on day two was Andrew Su, who gave a presentation titled "Open Data, Knowledge Graphs, and Large Language Models". This presentation discussed how to verify the accuracy of answers produced by Large language Models (LLM). A solution he presented was Retrieval-Augmented Generation (RAG).

=== Other Presentations ===
Other than the keynote speakers, there were a total of 36 talks and 23 posters selected to be presented at the conference over the course of multiple sessions. One of the sessions being Data Analysis. These presentations were about approaches to analyzing biomedical data, different types of data that are freely available for use, and some of the research that has been done using these open-source tools and data. Another session was titled Open Data Session, which included presentations about some of the freely available databases, open data portals, and platforms that are being used by researchers around the world. The session Visualization included presentations about new additions to older biological databases. The next session was titled “Standards and Frameworks for Open Science”. This session was all about how to create consistent, recyclable, and long lasting open source software. The final session was called “Open Approaches to AI/ML”, which was about how to use machine learning to solve biological problems.

==== Open Panel Discussion ====
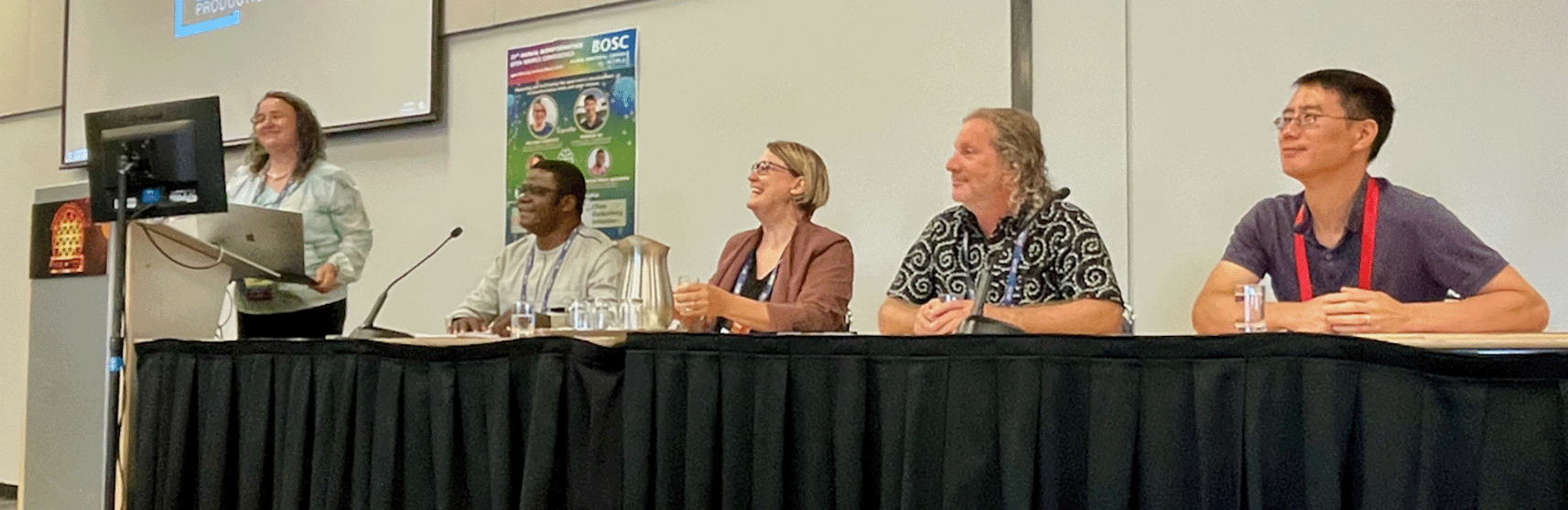
From left to right, Monica Munoz-Torres, Thomas Hervé Mboa Nkoudou, Mélanie Courtot, Lawrence Hunter, and Andrew Su during the “Open Source AI/ML: A Game Changer for Bioinformatics?” open panel discussion

The events of day two concluded with an open panel discussion titled “Open Source AI/ML: A Game Changer for Bioinformatics?”. The researchers on the panel included Lawrence Hunter, Thomas Hervé Mboa Nkoudou, Mélanie Courtot, and Andrew Su. The moderator of the panel was Monica Munoz-Torres. This discussion explored the benefits and drawbacks of using Artificial Intelligence and Machine Learning in Bioinformatics research.
