= BioRuby =

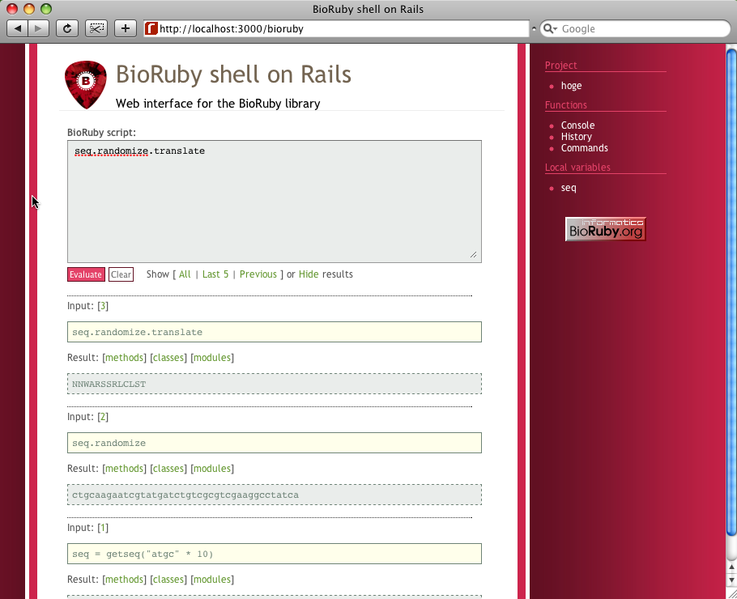
- A BioRuby shell on Rails
- Stable release: 2.0.2 / 31 December 2020; 5 years ago
- Written in: Ruby
- Type: Bioinformatics
- License: BSD 2-clause license
- Website: bioruby.open-bio.org
- Repository: github.com/bioruby/bioruby

BioRuby is a collection of open-source Ruby code, comprising classes for computational molecular biology and bioinformatics. It contains classes for DNA and protein sequence analysis, sequence alignment, biological database parsing, structural biology and other bioinformatics tasks. BioRuby is released under the BSD 2-clause license or Ruby licence and is one of a number of Bio* projects, designed to reduce code duplication.

In 2011, the BioRuby project introduced the Biogem software plugin system, with two or three new plugins added every month.

BioRuby is managed via the BioRuby website and GitHub repository.

== History ==
=== BioRuby ===
The BioRuby project was first started in 2000 by Toshiaki Katayama as a Ruby implementation of similar bioinformatics packages such as BioPerl and BioPython. The initial release of version 0.1 was frequently updated by contributors both informally and at organised “hackathon” events; in June 2005, BioRuby was funded by IPA as an Exploratory Software Project, culminating with the release of version 1.0.0 in February 2006. Between 2009 and 2012, BioRuby was the focus of a number of Google Summer of Code projects to improve the codebase. BioRuby Version 2.0.0 was released in 2019.

== Biogem ==
Biogem provides a set of tools for bioinformaticians who want to code an application or library that uses or extends BioRuby's core library, as well as share the code as a gem on rubygems.org. Any gem published via the Biogem framework is also listed at biogems.info.

The aim of Biogem is to promote a modular approach to the BioRuby package and simplify the creation of modules by automating process of setting up directory/file scaffolding, a git repository and releasing online package databases.

=== Popular Biogems ===
#	Biogem	Description	Version
1	bio	Bioinformatics Library	1.4.3.0001
2	biodiversity	Parser of scientific names	3.1.5
3	Simple Spreadsheet extractor	Basic spreadsheet content extraction using Apache poi	0.13.3
4	Bio gem	Software generator for Ruby	1.36
5	Bio samtools	Binder of samtools for Ruby	2.1.0
6	t2 server	Support for interacting with the taverna 2 server	1.1.0
7	bio ucsc api	The Ruby ucsc api	0.6.2
8	entrez	http request to entrez e-utilities	0.5.8.1
9	bio gadget	Gadget for bioinformatics	0.4.8
10	sequenceserver	Blast search made easy!	0.8.7

== See also ==
- Open Bioinformatics Foundation
- BioPerl
- BioPython
- BioJava
- BioJS
- Earth BioGenome Project
