= 1000 Plant Genomes Project =

Former international research effort

- Funding agency: Alberta Innovates Technology Futures; Alberta Agricultural Research Institute (AARI); Genome Alberta; University of Alberta; BGI; China National GeneBank (CNGB); Musea Ventures (Somekh Family Foundation)
- Duration: 2008 – 2019
- Website: onekp.com

The 1000 Plant Transcriptomes Initiative (1KP) was an international research effort to establish the most detailed catalogue of genetic variation in plants. It was announced in 2008 and headed by Gane Ka-Shu Wong and Michael Deyholos of the University of Alberta. The project successfully sequenced the transcriptomes (expressed genes) of 1,000 different plant species by 2014; its final capstone products were published in 2019.

1KP was a large-scale (involving many organisms) sequencing projects designed to take advantage of the wider availability of high-throughput ("next-generation") DNA sequencing technologies. The similar 1000 Genomes Project, for example, obtained high-coverage genome sequences of 1,000 individual people between 2008 and 2015, to better understand human genetic variation. The initiative provided a template for further planetary-scale genome projects, including the 10KP Project—sequencing the whole genomes of 10,000 plants, and the Earth BioGenome Project—aiming to sequence, catalogue, and characterize the genomes of all of Earth's eukaryotic biodiversity.

== Goals ==
As of 2002, the number of classified green plant species was estimated to be around 370,000, however, there are probably many thousands more yet unclassified. Despite this number, very few of these species have detailed DNA sequence information to date; 125,426 species in GenBank, as of 11 April 2012, but most (>95%) having DNA sequence for only one or two genes. "...almost none of the roughly half million plant species known to humanity has been touched by genomics at any level". The 1000 Plant Genomes Project aimed to produce a roughly a 100x increase in the number of plant species with available broad genome sequence.

=== Evolutionary relationships ===
There have been efforts to determine the evolutionary relationships between the known plant species, but phylogenies (or phylogenetic trees) created solely using morphological data, cellular structures, single enzymes, or on only a few sequences (like rRNA) can be prone to error; morphological features are especially vulnerable when two species look physically similar though they are not closely related (as a result of convergent evolution for example) or homology, or when two species closely related look very different because, for example, they are able to change in response to their environment very well. These situations are very common in the plant kingdom. An alternative method for constructing evolutionary relationships is through changes in DNA sequence of many genes between the different species which is often more robust to problems of similar-appearing species. With the amount of genomic sequence produced by this project, many predicted evolutionary relationships could be better tested by sequence alignment to improve their certainty. With 383,679 nuclear gene family phylogenies and 2,306 gene age distributions with Ks plots used in the final analysis and shared in GigaDB alongside the capstone paper.

=== Biotechnology applications ===
The list of plant genomes sequenced in the project was not random; instead plants that produce valuable chemicals or other products (secondary metabolites in many cases) were focused on in the hopes that characterizing the involved genes will allow the underlying biosynthetic processes to be used or modified. For example, there are many plants known to produce oils (like olives) and some of the oils from certain plants bear a strong chemical resemblance to petroleum products like the Oil palm and hydrocarbon-producing species. If these plant mechanisms could be used to produce mass quantities of industrially useful oil, or modified such that they do, then they would be of great value. Here, knowing the sequence of the plant's genes involved in the metabolic pathway producing the oil is a large first step to allow such utilization. A recent example of how engineering natural biochemical pathways works is Golden rice which has involved genetically modifying its pathway, so that a precursor to vitamin A is produced in large quantities making the brown-colored rice a potential solution for vitamin A deficiency. This is concept of engineering plants to do "work" is popular and its potential would dramatically increase as a result of gene information on these 1000 plant species. Biosynthetic pathways could also be used for mass production of medicinal compounds using plants rather than manual organic chemical reactions as most are created currently.

One of the most unexpected results of the project was the discovery of multiple novel light-sensitive ion-channels used extensively for optogenetic control of neurons discovered through sequencing and physiological characterization of opsins from over 100 species of alga species by the project. The characterization of these novel channelrhodopsin sequences providing resources for protein engineers who would normally have no interest in or ability to generate sequence data from these many plant species. A number of biotech companies are developing these channelrhodopsin proteins for medical purposes, with many of these optogenetic therapy candidates under clinical trials to restore vision for retinal blindness. The first published results of these treating retinitis pigmentosa coming out in July 2021.

== Project approach ==
Sequencing was initially done on the Illumina Genome Analyzer GAII next-generation DNA sequencing platform at the Beijing Genomics Institute (BGI Shenzhen, China), but later samples were run on the faster Illumina HiSeq 2000 platform. Starting with the 28 Illumina Genome Analyzer next-generation DNA sequencing machines, these were eventually upgraded to 100 HiSeq 2000 sequencers at the Beijing Genomics Institute. The initial 3Gb/run (3 billion base pairs per experiment) capacity of each of these machines enabled fast and accurate sequencing of the plant samples.

=== Species selection ===
The selection of plant species to be sequenced was compiled through an international collaboration of the various funding agencies and researcher groups expressing their interest in certain plants. There was a focus on those plant species that are known to have useful biosynthetic capacity to facilitate the biotechnology goals of the project, and selection of other species to fill in gaps and explain some unknown evolutionary relationships of the current plant phylogeny. In addition to industrial compound biosynthetic capacity, plant species known or suspected to produce medically active chemicals (such as poppies producing opiates) were assigned a high priority to better understand the synthesis process, explore commercial production potential, and discover new pharmaceutical options. A large number of plant species with medicinal properties were selected from traditional Chinese medicine (TCM). The completed list of selected species can be publicly viewed on the website, and methodological details and data access details have been published in detail.

=== Transcriptome vs. genome sequencing ===
Rather than sequencing the entire genome (all DNA sequence) of the various plant species, the project sequenced only those regions of the genome that produce a protein product (coding genes); the transcriptome. This approach is justified by the focus on biochemical pathways where only the genes producing the involved proteins are required to understand the synthetic mechanism, and because these thousands of sequences would represent adequate sequence detail to construct very robust evolutionary relationships through sequence comparison. The numbers of coding genes in plant species can vary considerably, but all have tens of thousands or more making the transcriptome a large collection of information. However, non-coding sequence makes up the majority (>90%) of the genome content. Although this approach is similar conceptually to expressed sequence tags (ESTs), it is fundamentally different in that the entire sequence of each gene will be acquired with high coverage rather than just a small portion of the gene sequence with an EST. To distinguish the two, the non-EST method is known as "shotgun transcriptome sequencing".

=== Transcriptome shotgun sequencing ===
mRNA (messenger RNA) is collected from a sample, converted to cDNA by a reverse transcriptase enzyme, and then fragmented so that it can be sequenced. Other than transcriptome shotgun sequencing, this technique has been called RNA-seq and whole transcriptome shotgun sequencing (WTSS). Once the cDNA fragments are sequenced, they will be de novo assembled (without aligning to a reference genome sequence) back into the complete gene sequence by combining all of the fragments from that gene during the data analysis phase. A new a de novo transcriptome assembler designed specifically for RNA-Seq was produced for this project, SOAPdenovo-Trans being part of the SOAP suite of genome assembly tools from the BGI.

=== Plant tissue sampling ===
The samples came from around the world, with a number of particularly rare species being supplied by botanical gardens such as the Fairy Lake Botanical Garden (Shenzhen, China). The type of tissue collected was determined by the expected location of biosynthetic activity; for example if an interesting process or chemical is known to exist primarily in the leaves, leaf sample was used. A number of RNA-sequencing protocols were adapted and tested for different tissue types, and these were openly shared via the protocols.io platform.

== Potential limitations ==
Since only the transcriptome was sequenced, the project did not reveal information about gene regulatory sequence, non-coding RNAs, DNA repetitive elements, or other genomic features that are not part of the coding sequence. Based on the few whole plant genomes collected so far, these non-coding regions will in fact make up the majority of the genome, and the non-coding DNA may actually be the primary driver of trait differences seen between species.

Since mRNA was the starting material, the amount of sequence representation for a given gene is based on the expression level (how many mRNA molecules it produces). This means that highly expressed genes get better coverage because there is more sequence to work from. The result, then, is that some important genes may not have been reliably detected by the project if they are expressed at a low level yet still have important biochemical functions.

Many plant species (especially agriculturally manipulated ones) are known to have undergone large genome-wide changes through duplication of the whole genome. The rice and the wheat genomes, for example, can have 4-6 copies of whole genomes (wheat) whereas animals typically only have 2 (diploidy). These duplicated genes may pose a problem for the de novo assembly of sequence fragments, because repeat sequences confuse the computer programs when trying to put the fragments together, and they can be difficult to track through evolution.

== Comparison with the 1000 Genomes Project ==
=== Similarities ===
Just as the Beijing Genomics Institute in Shenzhen, China is one of the major genomics centers involved in the 1000 Genomes Project, the institute is the site of sequencing for the 1000 Plant Genomes Project. Both projects are large-scale efforts to obtain detailed DNA sequence information to improve our understanding of the organisms, and both projects will utilize next-generation sequencing to facilitate a timely completion.

=== Differences ===
The goals of the two projects are significantly different. While the 1000 Genomes Project focuses on genetic variation in a single species, the 1000 Plant Genomes Project looks at the evolutionary relationships and genes of 1000 different plant species.

While the 1000 Genomes Project was estimated to cost up to US$50 million, the 1000 Plant Genomes Project was not as expensive; the difference in cost coming from the target sequence in the genomes. Since the 1000 Plant Genomes Project only sequenced the transcriptome, whereas the human project sequenced as much of the genome as is decided feasible, there is a much lower amount of sequencing effort needed in this more specific approach. While this means that there was less overall sequence output relative to the 1000 Genomes Project, the non-coding portions of the genomes excluded in the 1000 Plant Genomes Project were not as important to its goals like they are to the human project. So then the more focused approach of the 1000 Plant Genomes Project minimized cost while still achieving its goals.

== Funding ==
The project was funded by Alberta Innovates - Technology Futures (merger of iCORE ), Genome Alberta, the University of Alberta, the Beijing Genomics Institute (BGI), and Musea Ventures (a USA-based private investment firm). To date, the project received $1.5 million CAD from the Alberta Government and another $0.5 million from Musea Ventures. In January 2010, BGI announced that it would be contributing $100 million to large-scale sequencing projects of plants and animals (including the 1000 Plant Genomes Project, and then following on to the 10,000 Plant Genome Project).

== Related projects ==
- The 1000 Genomes Project – A Deep Catalog of Human Genetic Variation
- The 1001 Genomes Project – Sequencing the whole genome of 1,001 Arabidopsis strains
- Genome 10K – Whole genome sequence of 10,000 vertebrate species

== See also ==
- 1000 Genomes Project – International research effort on genetic variation
- International HapMap Project – Project that developed a haplotype map of the human genome
- Human Genome Project – International scientific research project (1990–2003)
- 100,000 Genomes Project – UK Government medical research project
- List of biological databases
