= GigaDB =

Disciplinary repository

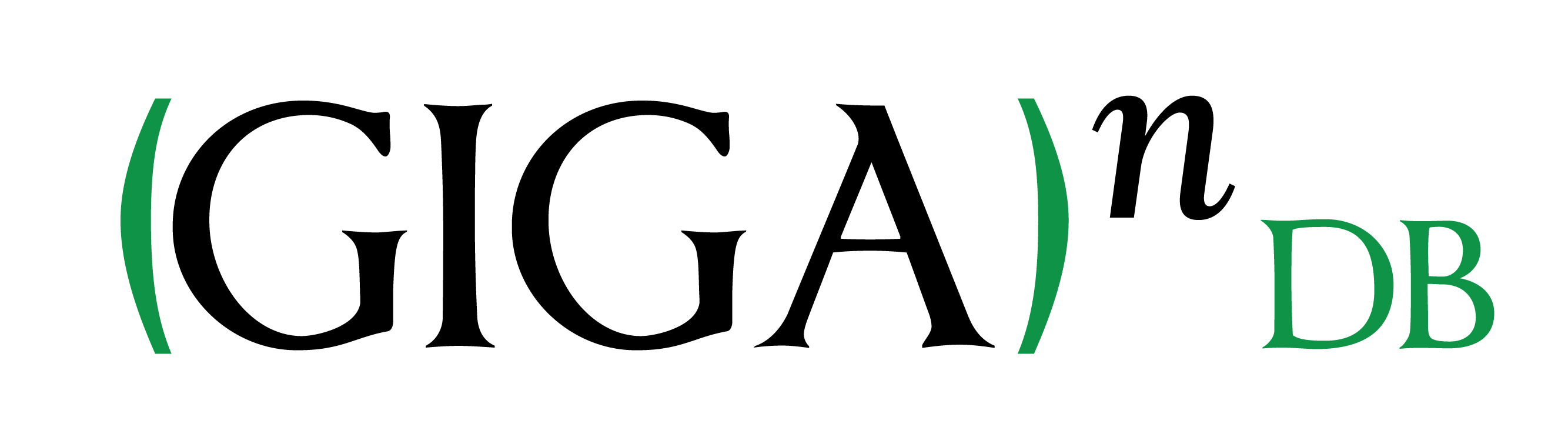
- Website type: Disciplinary repository
- Available in: English
- Owner: GigaScience Press/BGI Group
- Website: gigadb.org
- Launched: 2011
- Current status: Active
- Content license: CC0

GigaDB (GigaScience DataBase) is a disciplinary repository launched in 2011 with the aim of ensuring long-term access to massive multidimensional datasets from life science and biomedical science studies. The datasets are diverse and include genomic, transcriptomic, and imaging data. The datasets are curated by GigaDB biocurators who are employed by BGI and China National GeneBank.

In its inception, GigaDB was designed as the supporting archive for large-scale research data submitted to the GigaScience Press data journals GigaScience and GigaByte whose focus are on ensuring reproducibility and reusability of biological and biomedical research. The scope of GigaDB has broadened to include computational research objects such as synthetic data, software and workflows. The database uses Genomics Standard Consortium (GSC)-approved sample attributes and standards, also collaborating with the GSC to ensure data are comprehensive and discoverable. Datasets hosted in GigaDB are defined as a group of files and metadata that support a specific article or study. For each published GigaDB dataset, a DataCite digital object identifier is assigned and the data are indexed and discoverable in NCBI Datamed and the Clarivate Analytics Data Citation Index. GigaDB has also collaborated with Repositive to boost the discoverability of their human datasets.
