= Beijing Institute of Genomics =

Chinese research center

Beijing Institute of Genomics (BIG; Chinese: 北京基因组研究所; pinyin: Běijīng Jīyīnzǔ Yánjiūsuǒ) is a genomics research center of Chinese Academy of Sciences (CAS).

== History ==
BIG was officially founded by Yang Huanming, Wang Jian, Yu Jun and others scientists on November 28, 2003, when BGI (formerly the Beijing Genomics Institute, founded in 1999 to participate in the International Human Genome Project on behalf of China) became part of China Academy of Sciences. In 2007, Beijing Genomics Institute (BGI) and BIG split, with Yang Huanming and Wang Jian moving BGI out of the CAS system and taking it to Shenzhen, and Yu Jun maintaining BIG in CAS. Yu Jun formalising this split by selling his stake in BGI for a minor sum.

Its predecessor was Human Genome Research Center of Institute of Genetics and Developmental Biology (CAS) which was founded in August 1998.

Besides coming out of the International Human Genome Project, other achievements of BIG included the participation of the International HapMap Project; the completion of the Chinese Superhybrid Rice (Oryza sativa L. ssp. indica) Genome Project; the collaborations of the Silkworm Genome Project and the Chicken Genome Diversity Project.

In 2003, SARS virus became epidemic in China and BIG was the first to sequence SARS virus whole genome in China.

In 2007, BIG moved to ChaoYang District, Beijing.

== Current ==
At present, BIG has a number of nearly two hundred faculty and staff members, including one Academia Sinica academician and one CAS academician and the number of graduated students is about two hundred.

== Research Divisions ==
- CAS Key Laboratory of Genome Sciences & Information
- CAS Key Laboratory of Genomic and Precision Medicine
- National Genomics Data Center (formerly BIG Data Center)
- Core Genomic Facility

== Research Program ==
- International Rice Genome Sequencing Project
- International Chicken Genome Sequencing Project
- HapMap Project
- The Saudi-Sino Date Palm Genome Project
- Genome polymorphism of several populations in China
- The Cancer Genome Project
- The Stem Cell Genome Project

== Lists of Directors ==
- Yang Huanming
- Wu Chung-I
