= Short Oligonucleotide Analysis Package =

SOAP (Short Oligonucleotide Analysis Package) is a suite of bioinformatics software tools from the BGI Bioinformatics department enabling the assembly, alignment, and analysis of next generation DNA sequencing data. It is particularly suited to short read sequencing data.

All programs in the SOAP package may be used free of charge and are distributed under the GPL open source software license.

== Functionality ==
The SOAP suite of tools can be used to perform the following genome assembly tasks:

=== Sequence Alignment ===
SOAPaligner (SOAP2) is specifically designed for fast alignment of short reads and performs favorably with respect to similar alignment tools such as Bowtie and MAQ.

=== Genome Assembly ===
SOAPdenovo is a short read de novo assembler utilizing De Bruijn graph construction. It is optimized for short reads such as that generated by Illumina and is capable of assembling large genomes such as the human genome. SOAPdenovo was used to assemble the genome of the giant panda. This was upgraded to SOAPdenovo2, which was optimized for large genomes and included the widely used GapCloser module.

=== Transcriptome Assembly ===
SOAPdenovo-Trans is a de novo transcriptome assembler designed specifically for RNA-Seq that was created for the 1000 Plant Genomes project.

=== Indel Discovery ===
SOAPindel is a tool to find insertions and deletions from next generation paired-end sequencing data, providing a list of candidate indels with quality scores.

=== SNP Discovery ===
SOAPsnp is a consensus sequence builder. This tool uses the output from SOAPaligner to generate a consensus sequence which enables SNPs to be called on a newly sequenced individual.

=== Structural Variation Discovery ===
SOAPsv is a tool to find structural variations using whole genome assembly.

=== Quality control and preprocessing ===
SOAPnuke is a tool for integrated quality control and preprocessing of datasets from genomic, small RNA, Digital Gene Expression, and metagenomic experiments.

== History ==
=== SOAP v1 ===
The first release of SOAP consisted only of the sequence alignment tool SOAPaligner.

=== SOAP v2 ===
SOAP v2 extended and improved on SOAP v1 by significantly improving the performance of the SOAPaligner tool. Alignment time was reduced by a factor of 20-30, while memory usage was reduced by a factor of 3. Support was added for compressed file formats.

The SOAP suite was expanded then to include the new tools: SOAPdenovo 1&2, SOAPindel, SOAPsnp, and SOAPsv.

=== SOAP v3 ===
SOAP v3 extended the alignment tool by being the first short-read alignment tool to utilize GPU processors. As a result of these improvements, SOAPalign significantly outperformed competing aligners Bowtie and BWA in terms of speed.

== See also ==
- genomics
- genome sequencing
- genome assembly
- bioinformatics
