= Weiqi Zhang =

Chinese scientist

- 张维绮
- Education: Peking University (PhD); Nanchang University (BSc)
- Known for: Mechanisms of aging Stem cell aging and interventions Aging and aging-related disease interventions Aging clocks
- Scientific career
- Fields: Cell biology, gerontology, genomics
- Workplaces: China National Center for Bioinformation and Beijing Institute of Genomics, Chinese Academy of Sciences

Weiqi Zhang (Chinese: 张维绮; pinyin: Zhāng Wéiqǐ) is a Chinese scientist specializing in aging and stem cell biology. She is a Principal Investigator at the Beijing Institute of Genomics (BIG) under the Chinese Academy of Sciences (CAS) and the China National Center for Bioinformation (CNCB).

Her research leverages aging clocks to decode the complex mechanisms of aging and its associated pathologies. Her work ranges from uncovering deep mechanistic drivers and identifying therapeutic targets to developing novel anti-aging strategies, to implementing clinical precision interventions guided by biological age indices. As a corresponding author, she has authored over 100 peer-reviewed articles, including publications in Cell and Nature. Consistently ranked among the World's Top 2% Scientists, her contributions have been recognized twice as China's Top 10 Science Advances and five times as China's Top 10 Life Science Advances.

== Education and career ==
Zhang received her Bachelor of Science in Bioengineering from Nanchang University in 2005. She subsequently earned her Ph.D. in Cell biology from Peking University in 2011.

Following her doctoral studies, Zhang joined the Institute of Biophysics, Chinese Academy of Sciences, where she worked as a Research Associate (2011–2015), Associate Professor (2015–2016), and Professor (2016–2019). In 2019, she moved to the Beijing Institute of Genomics (BIG), CAS / China National Center for Bioinformation (CNCB), where she currently serves as a Professor. She is also a doctoral supervisor at the University of Chinese Academy of Sciences (UCAS).

== Research ==
Her research focuses on the mechanisms and interventions of aging and age-related diseases. For years, she has conducted foundational and translational research centered on the fundamental questions of gerontology: How old are we truly? Why do we age? And how can we age more slowly? Currently, her work is concentrated in three primary areas:

- Core Mechanisms of Aging:Utilizing a systems biology approach to uncover the drivers of aging and potential interventions, with a specific focus on epigenetic, immune, and metabolic mechanisms.
- Biomarkers & Biological Age: Leveraging big data analysis to systematically reveal biomarkers of organ and individual aging. By utilizing cross-age population cohorts and AI-driven computation, she is establishing a comprehensive index system for biological age and early warning protocols for age-related disease risks.
- Intervention Targets & Clinical Translation: Leveraging functional genomic screening to identify actionable targets for aging. She integrates pharmacogenomics, gene editing, and rejuvenating biology to develop novel anti-aging strategies and actively advances their clinical translation.

She frequently collaborates with scientists Guang-Hui Liu and Juan Carlos Izpisua Belmonte.

== Affiliations and recognition ==
Zhang is affiliated with several professional societies. She has served as the Vice Chairwoman of the Anti-Aging Branch of the Chinese Society of Gerontology and Geriatrics and is a Member of the Stem Cell Biology Branch of the Chinese Society for Cell Biology.

She has received several awards for her contributions to science, including:

- Zhong Nanshan Youth Science and Technology Innovation Award
- Stem Cell Excellence Young Investigator Award

== Selected publications ==
- Li, Jiaming; Jiang, Beier; Zhang, Wei; Hao, Junwei; Liu, Zhili; Ji, Qianzhao; Zheng, Yandong; Lu, Xiaoyong; Zheng, Zikai; Ma, Shuai; Fan, Yanlin; Gao, Dan-Dan; Hou, Xiao-Wen; Li, Jing; Tang, Jiazhen (9 July 2026). "Multimodal clocks of human aging". Cell. 189 (14): 4489–4511.e31. doi:10.1016/j.cell.2026.04.025. ISSN 0092-8674. PMID 42105758.
- Ping, Jiale; Qiao, Qin; Gao, Dan-Dan; Li, Yun; Fan, Yanling; Tian, Yutong; Xiong, Muzhao; Zheng, Quan; Jiang, Beier; Li, Jiaming; Huang, Zheng; Tu, Qinxin; Zheng, Zikai; Lu, Xiaoyong; Hu, Yiwen (14 April 2026). "Human immune aging clock identifies RUNX1 as a decelerator of T cell senescence". Immunity. 59 (4): 1039–1057.e11. doi:10.1016/j.immuni.2026.02.007. ISSN 1074-7613. PMID 41985437.
- Ding Y, Zuo Y, Zhang B, Fan Y, Xu G, Cheng Z, Ma S, Fang S, Tian A, Gao D, Xu X, Wang Q, Jing Y, Jiang M, Xiong M, Li J, Han Z, Sun S, Wang S, He F, Yang J, Qu J, Zhang W, Liu GH (October 2025). "Comprehensive human proteome profiles across a 50-year lifespan reveal aging trajectories and signatures". Cell. 188 (20): 5763–5784.e26. doi:10.1016/j.cell.2025.06.047. PMID 40713952.
- Fan Y, Zheng Y, Zhang Y, Xu G, Liu C, Hu J, Ji Q, Zhang S, Fang S, Lei J, Li LZ, Wang X, Xu X, Wang C, Wang S, Ma S, Song M, Jiang W, Zhu J, Feng Y, Wang J, Yang Y, Zhu G, Tian XL, Zhang H, Song W, Yang J, Yao Y, Liu GH, Qu J, Zhang W (May 2025). "ARID5A orchestrates cardiac aging and inflammation through MAVS mRNA stabilization". Nat Cardiovasc Res. 4 (5): 602–623. doi:10.1038/s44161-025-00635-z. PMID 40301689.
- Wang Q, Wang X, Liu B, Ma S, Zhang F, Sun S, Jing Y, Fan Y, Ding Y, Xiong M, Li J, Zhai Q, Zheng Y, Liu C, Xu G, Yang J, Wang S, Ye J, Izpisua Belmonte JC, Qu J, Liu GH, Zhang W (March 2024). "Aging induces region-specific dysregulation of hormone synthesis in the primate adrenal gland". Nat Aging. 4 (3): 396–413. doi:10.1038/s43587-024-00588-1. PMID 38503993.
- Yang Y, Lu X, Liu N, Ma S, Zhang H, Zhang Z, Yang K, Jiang M, Zheng Z, Qiao Y, Hu Q, Huang Y, Zhang Y, Xiong M, Liu L, Jiang X, Reddy P, Dong X, Xu F, Wang Q, Zhao Q, Lei J, Sun S, Jing Y, Li J, Cai Y, Fan Y, Yan K, Jing Y, Haghani A, Xing M, Zhang X, Zhu G, Song W, Horvath S, Rodriguez Esteban C, Song M, Wang S, Zhao G, Li W, Izpisua Belmonte JC, Qu J, Zhang W, Liu GH (October 2024). "Metformin decelerates aging clock in male monkeys". Cell. 187 (22): 6358–6378.e29. doi:10.1016/j.cell.2024.08.021. PMID 39270656.
- Sun S, Li J, Wang S, Li J, Ren J, Bao Z, Sun L, Ma X, Zheng F, Ma S, Sun L, Wang M, Yu Y, Ma M, Wang Q, Chen Z, Ma H, Wang X, Wu Z, Zhang H, Yan K, Yang Y, Zhang Y, Zhang S, Lei J, Teng ZQ, Liu CM, Bai G, Wang YJ, Li J, Wang X, Zhao G, Jiang T, Belmonte JC, Qu J, Zhang W, Liu GH (December 2023). "CHIT1-positive microglia drive motor neuron ageing in the primate spinal cord". Nature. 624 (7992): 611–620. doi:10.1038/s41586-023-06783-1. PMID 37907096.
