= Complete Genomics =

Chinese biotechnology company

- Type: Private
- Industry: Biotechnology
- Founded: 2006
- Headquarters: San Jose, California, U.S.
- Area served: Worldwide
- Parent: MGI
- Website: www.completegenomics.com

Complete Genomics is a life sciences company that has developed and commercialized a DNA sequencing platform for human genome sequencing and analysis.

== History ==
Complete Genomics was founded in June 2005 by Clifford Reid, Radoje (Rade) Drmanac, and John Curson. Clifford Reid was the chairman, president and chief executive officer of Complete Genomics before leaving in 2015 to set up Genos, a spinoff of Complete Genomics' consumer division.

In February 2009, Complete Genomics announced that it had sequenced its first human genome and submitted the resulting variant data to the National Center for Biotechnology Information database. In November 2009, Complete Genomics published sequence data for three human genomes in the journal Science.

The resulting data has supported research in diverse areas such as screening of embryos, detection of genetic relationships, neurology, aging, a novel Mendelian disease with neuromuscular and cardiac involvement, eating disorders, Prader-Willi syndrome and autism, ophthalmology, and oncology. In 2014, a collaboration among Radboud University (The Netherlands), Maastricht University Medical Centre (The Netherlands), Central South University (China) and Complete Genomics identified major causes of intellectual disability using whole genome sequencing.

In 2016, Complete Genomics contributed over 184 phased human genomes to George Church's Personal Genome Project. In 2019, they published their new single-tube long fragment read (stLFR) technology, enabling the construction of long DNA molecules from short reads using a combinatorial process of DNA barcoding. It enables phasing, SV detection, scaffolding, and cost-effective diploid de novo genome assembly from second-generation sequencing technology.

In March 2013, Complete Genomics was acquired by BGI Group, a genomics services company in Shenzhen, Guangdong, China. After the acquisition, Complete Genomics moved to San Jose and in June 2018 became part of MGI. MGI was a subsidiary of BGI Group before it was spun out and listed on the Shanghai Stock Exchange in 2022.

In February 2026, the company entered a definitive agreement to be acquired by Swiss Rockets AG, a Switzerland-based life sciences group.
