= Gigabyte (journal) =

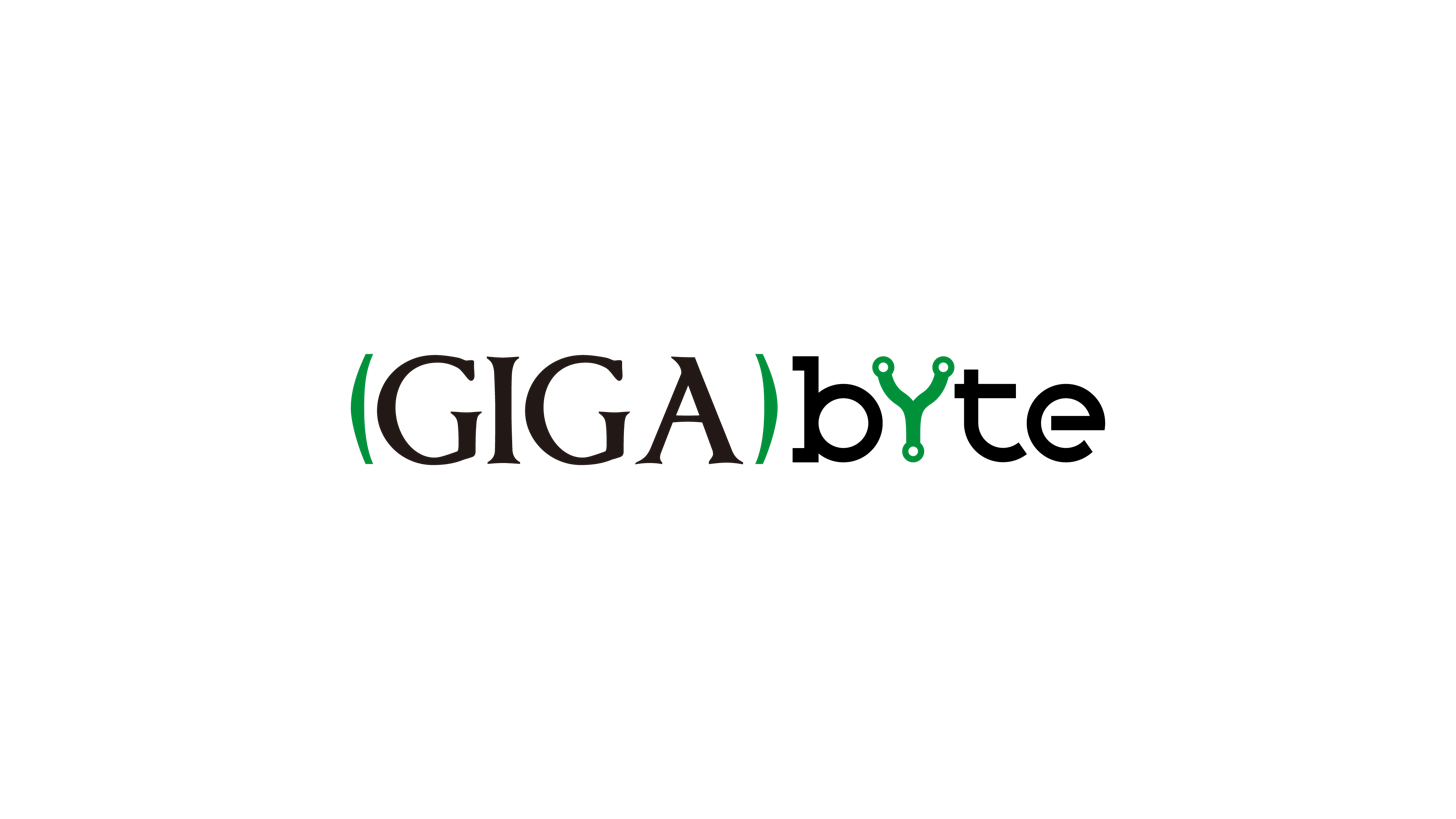
- Discipline: Life sciences
- Language: English
- Edited by: Scott Edmunds

Publication details
- History: 2020–present
- Publisher: GigaScience Press
- Open access: Yes
- License: Creative Commons Attribution 4.0
- Impact factor: 1.6 (2025)

Standard abbreviations
- ISO 4: Gigabyte

Indexing
- ISSN: 2709-4715

Links
- Journal homepage; Online access

Gigabyte (often styled GigaByte) is a peer-reviewed open-science journal published by GigaScience Press since 2020. It focuses on short, data-driven articles that describe and share open research datasets and software. The journal uses an exclusively XML-based publishing system that automates production, enabling changes to viewing formats and languages as well as the embedding of interactive content. In 2022, it received the ALPSP Award for Innovation in Publishing.

The journal mandates open peer review and the use of preprints. Following eLife, it was the second journal to adopt a "Publish, Review, Curate" model of peer review, which links reviews to preprints and provides an editor’s assessment for each reviewed preprint. Because it publicly reviews preprints, authors published in the journal are eligible for, and have previously received, Ben Barres Spotlight Awards, which support researchers from underrepresented backgrounds. In 2025, GigaScience Press received a Crossref Excellence in Metadata award for the metadata published by Gigabyte.

To host the large datasets associated with its articles, Gigabyte and its sister journal GigaScience use an in-house disciplinary repository called GigaDB. The journal is abstracted and indexed in PubMed, PubMed Central (PMC), the Directory of Open Access Journals (DOAJ), Web of Science (ESCI), Scopus, Biological Abstracts, BIOSIS Previews, and CNKI. Its 2025 Journal Impact Factor is 1.6.
