= Massively parallel sequencing =

DNA sequencing using the concept of massively parallel processing

Massively parallel sequencing (MPS) is any of several high-throughput approaches to DNA sequencing using the concept of massively parallel processing; it is also called next-generation sequencing (NGS) or second-generation sequencing. Some of these technologies emerged between 1993 and 1998 and have been commercially available since 2005. These technologies use miniaturized and parallelized platforms for sequencing of 1 million to 43 billion short reads (50 to 400 bases each) per instrument run.

Many NGS platforms differ in engineering configurations and sequencing chemistry. They share the technical paradigm of massively parallel sequencing via spatially separated, clonally amplified DNA templates or single DNA molecules in a flow cell. This design is very different from that of Sanger sequencing—also known as capillary sequencing or first-generation sequencing—which is based on electrophoretic separation of chain-termination products produced in individual sequencing reactions. This methodology allows sequencing to be completed on a larger scale.

== History ==
In the 1990s, Applied Biosystems dominated DNA sequencing technology with their automated capillary electrophoresis Sanger sequencing machines. However, the early 2000s saw many new companies entering the market, driven by the goal of reducing genome sequencing costs below $1000 following the enthusiasm generated by the Human Genome Project. Many of these new methods were first developed with support from the National Institutes of Health (NIH) funding under the 'Technology Development for the $1,000 Genome' program, launched during Francis Collins’ tenure as director of the National Human Genome Research Institute.

The first next-generation sequencers were based on pyrosequencing, originally developed by Pyrosequencing AB and later commercialized by 454 Life Sciences. In 2003, 454 Life Sciences launched the GS20, the first NGS DNA sequencer. This system provided reads approximately 400–500 bp long with 99% accuracy, enabling sequencing of about 25 million bases in a four-hour run at significantly lower costs compared to Sanger sequencing. The sequencing machines developed by 454 represented a paradigm shift by enabling the mass parallelisation of sequencing reactions, which significantly boosted the amount of DNA sequenced per run, making 454 Life Sciences the first major success in commercial NGS technology.

Also in 2003, Solexa began developing a competing method known as Sequencing by Synthesis (SBS). In 2004, Solexa acquired colony sequencing (bridge amplification) technology from Manteia, producing densely clustered DNA fragments ("polonies") immobilized on flow cells. These dense clusters generated stronger fluorescent signals, improving accuracy and reducing optical costs. In 2005, Solexa integrated an engineered DNA polymerase and reversible terminator nucleotides, allowing repeated cycles of sequencing and imaging. The first commercial sequencer based on this technology, Genome Analyzer, was launched in 2006, providing shorter reads (about 35 bp) but higher throughput (up to 1 Gbp per run) and paired-end sequencing capability, in which both ends of a DNA fragment are sequenced.

in 2007, 454 Life Sciences was acquired by Roche and Solexa by Illumina, the same year Applied Biosystems introduced SOLiD, a ligation-based sequencing platform. However, SOLiD encountered issues sequencing palindromic regions and was eventually discontinued. In 2011, Ion Torrent introduced another alternative, measuring proton (pH) changes during nucleotide incorporation using semiconductor-based sensors. Ion Torrent systems rapidly produced 100 bp reads but frequently struggled with accurately sequencing homopolymers, ultimately leading to their abandonment.

Due to limitations in competing methods, Illumina’s SBS technology eventually dominated the sequencing market. By 2012, expectations that 454 would gain a substantial share of the sequencing market had not been realized, and Roche’s 2007 acquisition was increasingly viewed as underperforming; that same year, Roche made an unsuccessful attempt to acquire Illumina. In October 2013, Roche announced that it would shut down 454, and stop supporting the platform by mid-2016. By 2014, Illumina controlled approximately 70% of DNA sequencer sales and generated over 90% of sequencing data. That year, Illumina introduced the HiSeq X Ten platform, significantly increasing throughput and claiming the long-targeted goal of sequencing human genomes at roughly $1000 each. Illumina surpassed this milestone in 2017 with the release of NovaSeq, a system capable of generating over 3000 Gbp per run.

Ongoing growth in demand for sequencing data, along with the 2023 expiration of several key Illumina patents, has encouraged a wave of short-read sequencing competitors, each bringing distinct chemistries, flow-cell designs, throughput levels, and cost structures. By the early 2020s, Illumina's sequencing-by-synthesis platforms remained dominant; a 2023 overview estimated that more than 90% of the world's sequencing data in 2022 had been generated on Illumina instruments. Competitors included MGI Tech, whose DNBSEQ platforms use DNA nanoballs rather than Illumina-style bridge amplification, and Ultima Genomics, which developed a production-scale platform using a spinning-disc flow cell. Singular Genomics introduced the G4 Sequencing Platform in late 2021, Element Biosciences followed by announcing AVITI Sequencing in March 2022, and PacBio later entered the short-read space with its Onso benchtop platform, unveiled in October 2022.

Illumina's NovaSeq X series began shipping in 2023 and used a redesigned flow cell, updated sequencing chemistry, and upgraded optics. Illumina stated that the system could generate up to three times as much data per run as the previous NovaSeq 6000 and reduce the cost of sequencing a human genome to about US$200 when fully utilized.

PacBio's involvement in the short-read market was short-lived: after launching the Onso short-read platform in 2023, the company completed the sale of select intellectual property and other assets related to its short-read sequencing technology to Illumina in January 2026.

== NGS platforms ==
DNA sequencing with commercially available NGS platforms is generally conducted with the following steps. First, DNA sequencing libraries are generated by clonal amplification by PCR in vitro. Second, the DNA is sequenced by synthesis, such that the DNA sequence is determined by the addition of nucleotides to the complementary strand rather than through chain-termination chemistry. Third, the spatially segregated, amplified DNA templates are sequenced simultaneously in a massively parallel fashion without the requirement for a physical separation step. These steps are followed in most NGS platforms, but each utilizes a different strategy.

NGS parallelization of the sequencing reactions generates hundreds of megabases to gigabases of nucleotide sequence reads in a single instrument run. This has enabled a drastic increase in available sequence data and fundamentally changed genome sequencing approaches in the biomedical sciences. Newly emerging NGS technologies and instruments have further contributed to a significant decrease in the cost of sequencing nearing the mark of $500 per genome sequencing in 2022.

As of 2014, massively parallel sequencing platforms are commercially available and their features are summarized in the table. As the pace of NGS technologies is advancing rapidly, technical specifications and pricing are in flux.

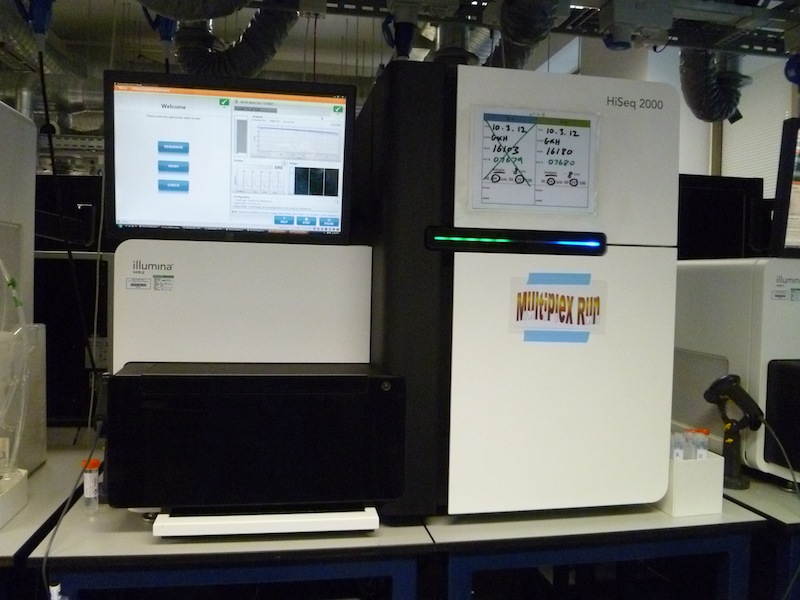
An Illumina HiSeq 2000 sequencing machine

NGS platforms
Platform	Template preparation	Chemistry	Max read length (bases)	Run times (days)	Max Gb per Run
Roche 454	Clonal-emPCR	Pyrosequencing	400‡	0.42	0.40-0.60
GS FLX Titanium	Clonal-emPCR	Pyrosequencing	400‡	0.42	0.035
Illumina MiSeq	Clonal Bridge Amplification	Reversible Dye Terminator	2x300	0.17-2.7	15
Illumina HiSeq	Clonal Bridge Amplification	Reversible Dye Terminator	2x150	0.3-11	1000
Illumina Genome Analyzer IIX	Clonal Bridge Amplification	Reversible Dye Terminator	2x150	2-14	95
Life Technologies SOLiD4	Clonal-emPCR	Oligonucleotide 8-mer Chained Ligation	20-45	4-7	35-50
Life Technologies Ion Proton	Clonal-emPCR	Native dNTPs, proton detection	200	0.5	100
Complete Genomics	Gridded DNA-nanoballs	Oligonucleotide 9-mer Unchained Ligation	7x10	11	3000
Helicos Biosciences Heliscope	Single Molecule	Reversible Dye Terminator	35‡	8	25
Pacific Biosciences SMRT	Single Molecule	Phospholinked Fluorescent Nucleotides	10,000 (N50); 30,000+ (max)	0.08	0.5

Run times and gigabase (Gb) output per run for single-end sequencing are noted. Run times and outputs approximately double when performing paired-end sequencing. ‡Average read lengths for the Roche 454 and Helicos Biosciences platforms.

== Template preparation methods for NGS ==
Two methods are used in preparing templates for NGS reactions: amplified templates originating from single DNA molecules, and single DNA molecule templates. For imaging systems which cannot detect single fluorescence events, amplification of DNA templates is required. The three most common amplification methods are emulsion PCR (emPCR), rolling circle and solid-phase amplification. The final distribution of templates can be spatially random or on a grid.

=== Emulsion PCR ===
In emulsion PCR methods, a DNA library is first generated through random fragmentation of genomic DNA. Single-stranded DNA fragments (templates) are attached to the surface of beads with adaptors or linkers, and one bead is attached to a single DNA fragment from the DNA library. The surface of the beads contains oligonucleotide probes with sequences that are complementary to the adaptors binding the DNA fragments. The beads are then compartmentalized into water-oil emulsion droplets. In the aqueous water-oil emulsion, each of the droplets capturing one bead is a PCR microreactor that produces amplified copies of the single DNA template.

=== Gridded rolling circle nanoballs ===
Amplification of a population of single DNA molecules by rolling circle amplification in solution is followed by capture on a grid of spots sized to be smaller than the DNAs to be immobilized. Second-generation sequencing technologies like MGI Tech's DNBSEQ or Element Biosciences' AVITI use this approach for the preparation of the sample on the flow cell that is then imaged cycle by cycle.

=== DNA colony generation (Bridge amplification) ===
Forward and reverse primers are covalently attached at high-density to the slide in a flow cell. The ratio of the primers to the template on the support defines the surface density of the amplified clusters. The flow cell is exposed to reagents for polymerase-based extension, and priming occurs as the free/distal end of a ligated fragment "bridges" to a complementary oligo on the surface. Repeated denaturation and extension results in localized amplification of DNA fragments in millions of separate locations across the flow cell surface. Solid-phase amplification produces 100–200 million spatially separated template clusters, providing free ends to which a universal sequencing primer is then hybridized to initiate the sequencing reaction. This technology was filed for a patent in 1997 from Glaxo-Welcome's Geneva Biomedical Research Institute (GBRI), by Pascal Mayer, Eric Kawashima, and Laurent Farinelli, and was publicly presented for the first time in 1998. In 1994 Chris Adams and Steve Kron filed a patent on a similar, but non-clonal, surface amplification method, named “bridge amplification” adapted for clonal amplification in 1997 by Church and Mitra.

=== Single-molecule templates ===
Protocols requiring DNA amplification are often cumbersome to implement and may introduce sequencing errors. The preparation of single-molecule templates is more straightforward and does not require PCR, which can introduce errors in the amplified templates. AT-rich and GC-rich target sequences often show amplification bias, which results in their underrepresentation in genome alignments and assemblies. Single molecule templates are usually immobilized on solid supports using one of at least three different approaches. In the first approach, spatially distributed individual primer molecules are covalently attached to the solid support. The template, which is prepared by randomly fragmenting the starting material into small sizes (for example,~200–250 bp) and adding common adapters to the fragment ends, is then hybridized to the immobilized primer. In the second approach, spatially distributed single-molecule templates are covalently attached to the solid support by priming and extending single-stranded, single-molecule templates from immobilized primers. A common primer is then hybridized to the template. In either approach, DNA polymerase can bind to the immobilized primed template configuration to initiate the NGS reaction. Both of the above approaches are used by Helicos BioSciences. In a third approach, spatially distributed single polymerase molecules are attached to the solid support, to which a primed template molecule is bound. This approach is used by Pacific Biosciences. Larger DNA molecules (up to tens of thousands of base pairs) can be used with this technique and, unlike the first two approaches, the third approach can be used with real-time methods, resulting in potentially longer read lengths.

== Sequencing approaches ==
=== Sequencing by synthesis ===
The objective for sequential sequencing by synthesis (SBS) is to determine the sequencing of a DNA sample by detecting the incorporation of a nucleotide by a DNA polymerase. An engineered polymerase is used to synthesize a copy of a single strand of DNA and the incorporation of each nucleotide is monitored. The principle of sequencing by synthesis was first described in 1993 with improvements published some years later. The key parts are highly similar for all embodiments of SBS and include (1) amplification of DNA to enhance the subsequent signal and to attach the DNA to be sequenced to a solid support, (2) generation of single stranded DNA on the solid support, (3) incorporation of nucleotides using an engineered polymerase and (4) detection of the incorporation of nucleotide. Then steps 3-4 are repeated and the sequence is assembled from the signals obtained in step 4. This principle of sequencing-by-synthesis has been used for almost all massively parallel sequencing instruments, including 454, PacBio, IonTorrent, Illumina and MGI.

=== Pyrosequencing ===
The principle of Pyrosequencing was first described in 1993 by combining a solid support with an engineered DNA polymerase lacking 3´to 5´exonuclease activity (proof-reading) and luminescence real-time detection using the firefly luciferase. All the key concepts of sequencing by synthesis were introduced, including (1) amplification of DNA to enhance the subsequent signal and attach the DNA to be sequenced (template) to a solid support, (2) generation of single stranded DNA on the solid support (3) incorporation of nucleotides using an engineered polymerase and (4) detection of the incorporated nucleotide by light detection in real-time. In a follow-up article, the concept was further developed and in 1998, an article was published in which the authors showed that non-incorporated nucleotides could be removed with a fourth enzyme (apyrase) allowing sequencing by synthesis to be performed without the need for washing away non-incorporated nucleotides.

=== Sequencing by reversible terminator chemistry ===
This approach uses reversible terminator-bound dNTPs in a cyclic method that comprises nucleotide incorporation, fluorescence imaging and cleavage. A fluorescently-labeled terminator is imaged as each dNTP is added and then cleaved to allow incorporation of the next base. These nucleotides are chemically blocked such that each incorporation is a unique event. An imaging step follows each base incorporation step, then the blocked group is chemically removed to prepare each strand for the next incorporation by DNA polymerase. This series of steps continues for a specific number of cycles, as determined by user-defined instrument settings. The 3' blocking groups were originally conceived as either enzymatic or chemical reversal The chemical method has been the basis for the Solexa and Illumina machines. Sequencing by reversible terminator chemistry can be a four-colour cycle such as used by Illumina/Solexa, or a one-colour cycle such as used by Helicos BioSciences. Helicos BioSciences used “virtual Terminators”, which are unblocked terminators with a second nucleoside analogue that acts as an inhibitor. These terminators have the appropriate modifications for terminating or inhibiting groups so that DNA synthesis is terminated after a single base addition.

=== Sequencing-by-ligation mediated by ligase enzymes ===
In this approach, the sequence extension reaction is not carried out by polymerases but rather by DNA ligase and either one-base-encoded probes or two-base-encoded probes. In its simplest form, a fluorescently labelled probe hybridizes to its complementary sequence adjacent to the primed template. DNA ligase is then added to join the dye-labelled probe to the primer. Non-ligated probes are washed away, followed by fluorescence imaging to determine the identity of the ligated probe. The cycle can be repeated either by using cleavable probes to remove the fluorescent dye and regenerate a 5′-PO4 group for subsequent ligation cycles (chained ligation) or by removing and hybridizing a new primer to the template (unchained ligation).

=== Phospholinked Fluorescent Nucleotides or Real-time sequencing ===
Pacific Biosciences is currently leading this method. The method of real-time sequencing involves imaging the continuous incorporation of dye-labelled nucleotides during DNA synthesis: single DNA polymerase molecules are attached to the bottom surface of individual zero-mode waveguide detectors (Zmw detectors) that can obtain sequence information while phospholinked nucleotides are being incorporated into the growing primer strand. Pacific Biosciences uses a unique DNA polymerase which better incorporates phospholinked nucleotides and enables the resequencing of closed circular templates. While single-read accuracy is 87%, consensus accuracy has been demonstrated at 99.999% with multi-kilobase read lengths. In 2015, Pacific Biosciences released a new sequencing instrument called the Sequel System, which increases capacity approximately 6.5-fold.

== See also ==
- Clinical metagenomic sequencing
- First-generation sequencing
- Third-generation sequencing
- RNA Velocity
