= Christopher Adams (scientist) =

American scientist

Christopher P. Adams is an American scientist, entrepreneur, and inventor who founded and led (as chief executive officer) multiple biotechnology companies, including Mosaic Technologies and Andarix Pharmaceuticals. Adams has made a notable contribution to the field of genetics as a co-inventor (with Steve Kron) of "bridge amplification," a polymerase chain reaction (PCR) technique that paved the way for development of DNA sequencing and genome sequencing. Geneticist George Church and computational biologist Rob Mitra adapted Adams' and Kron's technique to be used for clonal amplification.

Adams has spoken about the difficulties he faced in launching Mosaic and getting investors to buy in. He cites being "an African American without a graduate degree" and not seen as someone who could excel in this space as a major reason he faced skepticism and rejection while attempting to start Mosaic, and that his persistence was a key factor that helped him "overcome investors' reluctance." Adams has said:

"Keep in mind, I had no Ph.D. and no MBA and no real serious executive business experience. Couple that with being an African-American and I really didn't fit the mold. I also want to make it plain, though, that I think we're over that now. I do have a track record now. I think that it's almost a non-factor going forward."
