= Wang Jian (geneticist) =

Chinese geneticist and businessman (born 1954)

- 汪建
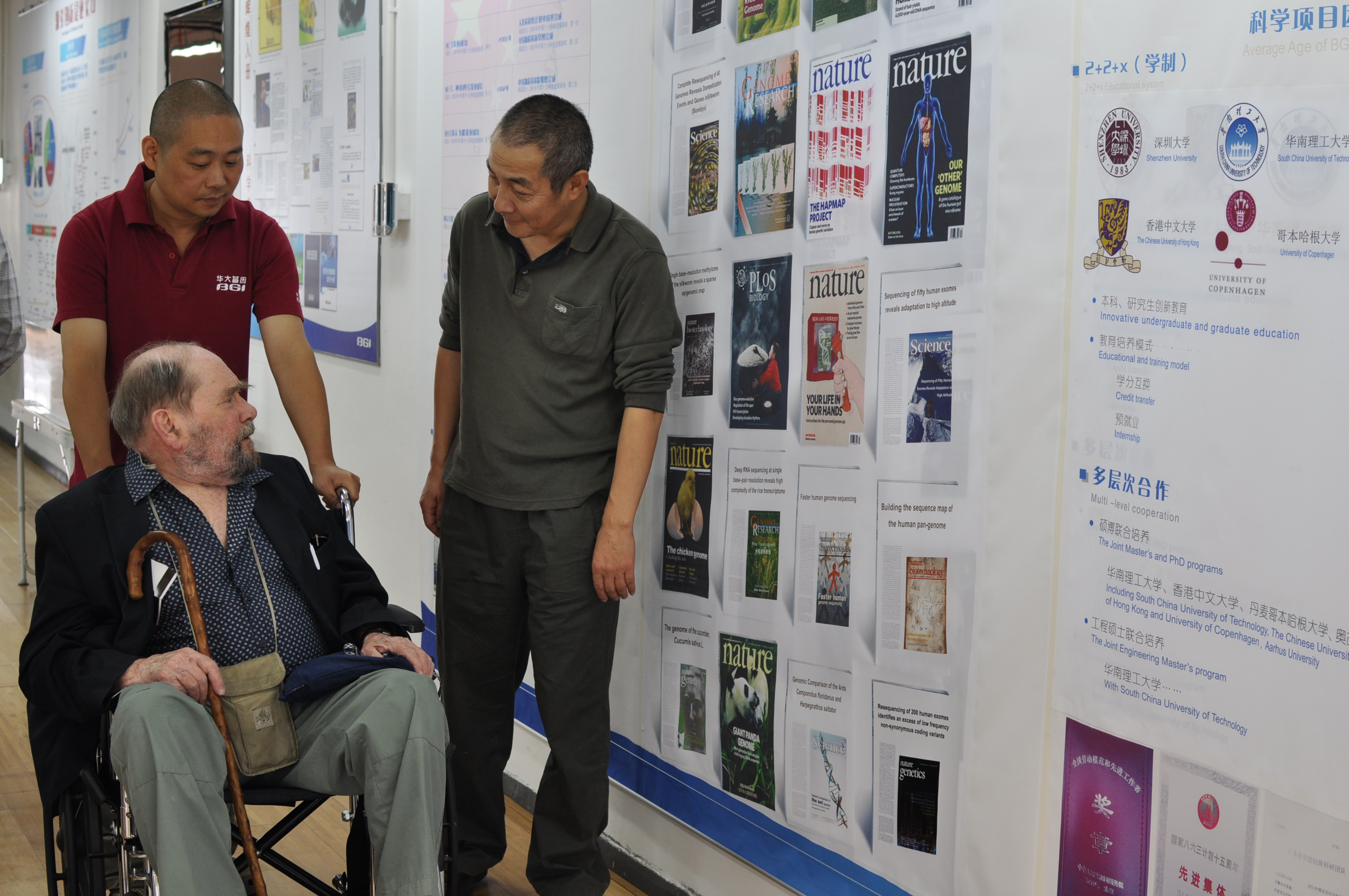
- Wang Jian and Sydney Brenner at BGI HQ in 2010
- Born: April 13, 1954 (age 72)
- Education: Hunan Medical College; Beijing University of Chinese Medicine
- Known for: Co-founding BGI (Beijing Genomics Institute)
- Scientific career
- Fields: Genetics, genomics
- Workplaces: BGI Genomics; University of Texas, University of Iowa, University of Washington

Wang Jian (Chinese: 汪建; born 13 April 1954) is a Chinese geneticist and businessman. He is Chairman and co-founder of the BGI Genomics (formerly Beijing Genomics Institute).

== Education ==
He graduated in 1979 from Hunan Medical College and in 1986 graduated with a Master's in Integrated Medicines from the Beijing University of Chinese Medicine. From 1988 to 1994, he was a research fellow at the University of Texas, the University of Iowa and the University of Washington, working on cell proliferation and differentiation.

== Career ==
After returning to China in 1994 to set up Jubilee Biotechnology, this provided much of the initial capital used to set up the Beijing Genomics Institute with Yang Huanming, Liu Siqi and Yu Jun in 1999 in order to engage in research contributing to the Human Genome Project. After this work he was involved in the sequencing of the rice genome, first Asian human reference genome and numerous other large-scale genomics projects. In 2003, he was involved in the efforts to sequence and contain the SARS coronavirus, meeting with former General Secretary of the Chinese Communist Party Hu Jintao who praised BGI's contribution. In 2007, the Beijing Genomics Institute become just BGI when it was relocated to Shenzhen as "the first citizen-managed, non-profit research institution in China". As the largest shareholder in BGI's holding company, in 2019 his net worth was estimated by Forbes to be US$1.2 billion. In January 2020, he travelled to Wuhan to set up a situation room tackling the COVID-19 disease outbreak, helping coordinate the development of diagnostic tests and a 2000-sq-meter emergency detection laboratory built in 5 days.

Devoted to fitness and believing health and longevity to be the first priority of BGI, he has climbed and skied on some of the highest mountains in the world, including summiting Mount Everest. On top of participating in surveys to the North and South Poles, in late 2021 he participated in a 53-day expedition sampling organisms at the Challenger Deep, the deepest known point of the seabed at the southern end of the Mariana Trench. Making dives to depths of under 10,000m in the manned submersible vehicle Fendouzhe, and making him at 67 years of age one of the only people to have been to the highest and lowest points on earth.

== See also ==
- BGI Group
