= Data publishing =

Act of making research datasets available

Data publishing (also data publication) is the act of releasing research data in published form for use by others. It is a practice consisting in preparing certain data or data set(s) for public use thus to make them available to everyone to use as they wish. This practice is an integral part of the open science movement. There is a large and multidisciplinary consensus on the benefits resulting from this practice.

The main goal is to elevate data to be first class research outputs. There are a number of initiatives underway as well as points of consensus and issues still in contention.

There are several distinct ways to make research data available, including:

- publishing data as supplemental material associated with a research article, typically with the data files hosted by the publisher of the article
- hosting data on a publicly available website, with files available for download
- hosting data in a repository that has been developed to support data publication, e.g. figshare, Dryad, Dataverse, Zenodo. A large number of general and specialty (such as by research topic) data repositories exist. For example, the UK Data Service enables users to deposit data collections and re-share these for research purposes.
- publishing a data paper about the dataset, which may be published as a preprint, in a regular journal, or in a data journal that is dedicated to supporting data papers. The data may be hosted by the journal or hosted separately in a data repository.

Publishing data allows researchers to both make their data available to others to use, and enables datasets to be cited similarly to other research publication types (such as articles or books), thereby enabling producers of datasets to gain academic credit for their work.

The motivations for publishing data may range for a desire to make research more accessible, to enable citability of datasets, or research funder or publisher mandates that require open data publishing. The UK Data Service is one key organisation working with others to raise the importance of citing data correctly and helping researchers to do so.

Solutions to preserve privacy within data publishing has been proposed, including privacy protection algorithms, data ”masking” methods, and regional privacy level calculation algorithm.

== Methods for publishing data ==
=== Data files as supplementary material ===
A large number of journals and publishers support supplementary material being attached to research articles, including datasets. Though historically such material might have been distributed only by request or on microform to libraries, journals today typically host such material online. Supplementary material is available to subscribers to the journal or, if the article or journal is open access, to everyone.

=== Data repositories ===
There are a large number of data repositories, on both general and specialized topics. Many repositories are disciplinary repositories, focused on a particular research discipline such as the UK Data Service which is a trusted digital repository of social, economic and humanities data. Repositories may be free for researchers to upload their data or may charge a one-time or ongoing fee for hosting the data. These repositories offer a publicly accessible web interface for searching and browsing hosted datasets, and may include additional features such as a digital object identifier, for permanent citation of the data, and linking to associated published papers and code. Related to this, there are also data publishing services e.g. Open Context, a service for archaeology. Such services enable search, query, analysis and citation of each individual record of data. The granularity and integration allows for publication and public exhibition of data dynamically on the Web.

=== Data papers ===
Data papers or data articles are “scholarly publication of a searchable metadata document describing a particular on-line accessible dataset, or a group of datasets, published in accordance to the standard academic practices”. Their final aim is to provide “information on the what, where, why, how and who of the data”. The intent of a data paper is to offer descriptive information on the related dataset(s) focusing on data collection, distinguishing features, access and potential reuse rather than on data processing and analysis. Because data papers are considered academic publications no different than other types of papers, they allow scientists sharing data to receive credit in currency recognizable within the academic system, thus "making data sharing count". This provides not only an additional incentive to share data, but also through the peer review process, increases the quality of metadata and thus reusability of the shared data.

Thus data papers represent the scholarly communication approach to data sharing. Despite their potentiality, data papers are not the ultimate and complete solution for all the data sharing and reuse issues and, in some cases, they are considered to induce false expectations in the research community.

=== Data journals ===
Data papers are supported by a rich array of data journals, some of which are "pure", i.e. they are dedicated to publish data papers only, while others – the majority – are "mixed", i.e. they publish a number of articles types including data papers.

A comprehensive survey on data journals is available. A non-exhaustive list of data journals has been compiled by staff at the University of Edinburgh.

Examples of "pure" data journals are: Earth System Science Data, Journal of Open Archaeology Data, Open Health Data, Polar Data Journal, and Scientific Data.

Examples of "mixed" journals publishing data papers are: Biodiversity Data Journal, F1000Research, GigaScience, GigaByte, PLOS ONE, and SpringerPlus.

=== Data citation ===
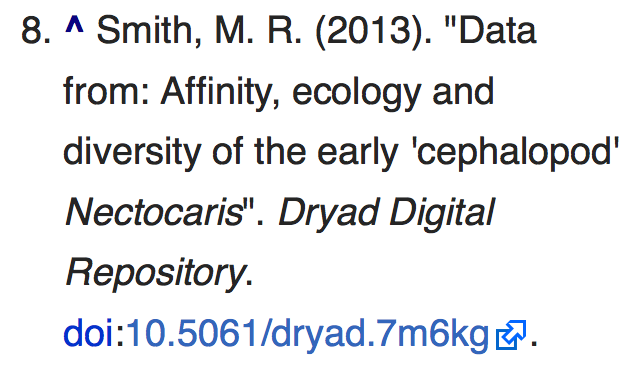
A data citation example

Data citation is the provision of accurate, consistent and standardised referencing for datasets just as bibliographic citations are provided for other published sources like research articles or monographs. Typically the well established Digital Object Identifier (DOI) approach is used with DOIs taking users to a website that contains the metadata on the dataset and the dataset itself.

==== History of development ====
A 2011 paper reported an inability to determine how often data citation happened in social sciences.

2012-13 papers reported that data citation was becoming more common but the practice for it was not standard.

In 2014 FORCE 11 published the Joint Declaration of Data Citation Principles covering the purpose, function and attributes of data citation.

In October 2018 CrossRef expressed its support for cataloging datasets and recommending their citation.

A popular data-oriented journal reported in April 2019 that it would now use data citations.

A June 2019 paper suggested that increased data citation will make the practice more valuable for everyone by encouraging data sharing and also by increasing the prestige of people who share.

Data citation is an emerging topic in computer science and it has been defined as a computational problem. Indeed, citing data poses significant challenges to computer scientists and the main problems to address are related to:

- the use of heterogeneous data models and formats – e.g., relational databases, Comma-Separated Values (CSV), Extensible Markup Language (XML), Resource Description Framework (RDF);
- the transience of data;
- the necessity to cite data at different levels of coarseness – i.e., deep citations;
- the necessity to automatically generate citations to data with variable granularity.

== See also ==
- Data archiving
- Disciplinary repository
- Open science data
- Registry of Research Data Repositories
