= BGI Group =

Chinese genome sequencing company

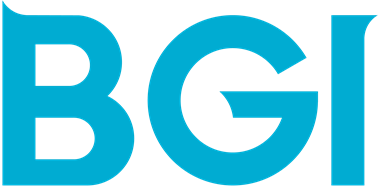

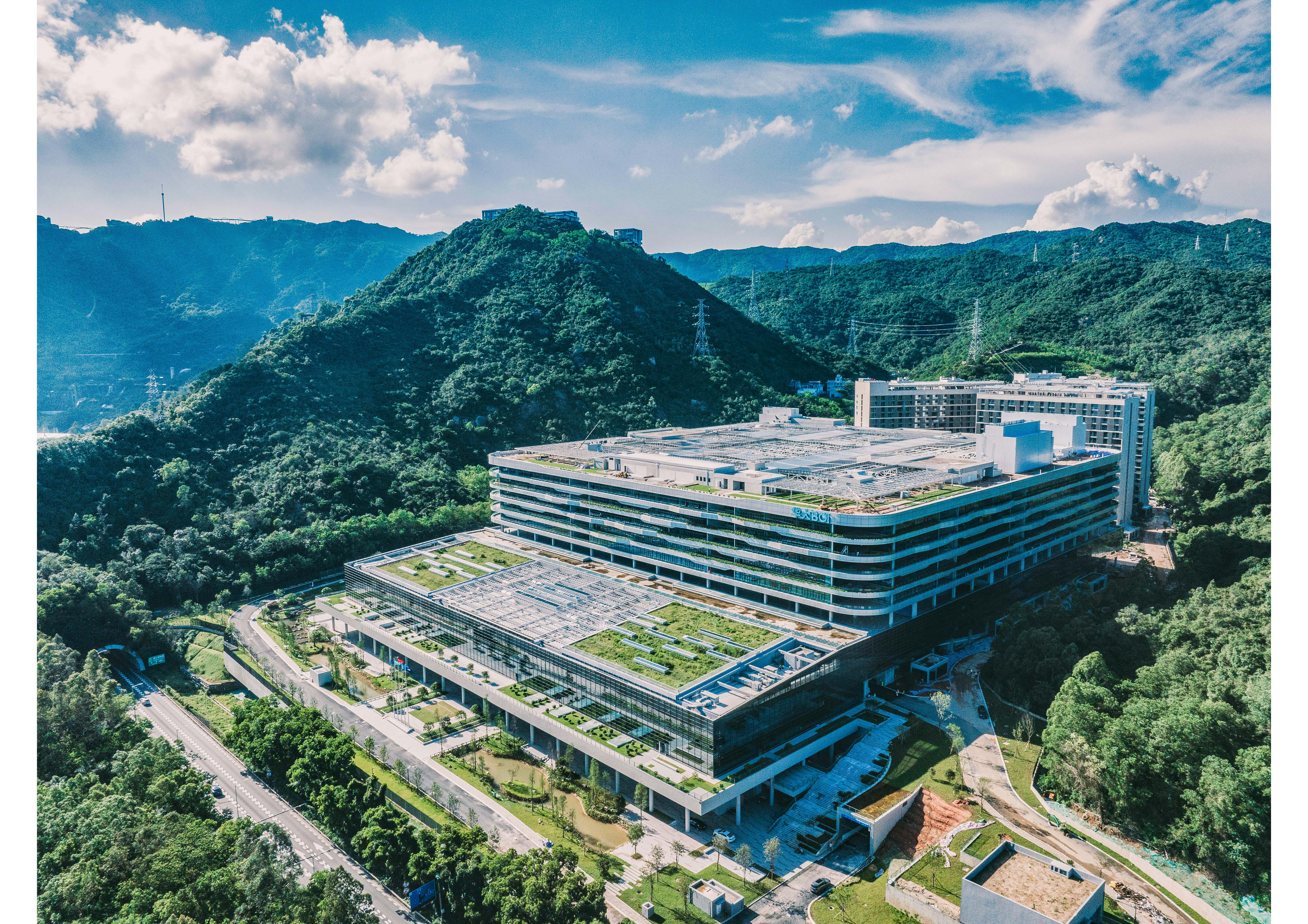
- BGI headquarters in Shenzhen
- Native name: 深圳华大基因科技有限公司
- Formerly: Beijing Genomics Institute
- Type: Private
- Industry: Omics; Genome sequencing Biotechnology
- Founded: September 9, 1999; 27 years ago
- Founder: Wang Jian; Yu Jun; Yang Huanming; Liu Siqi
- Headquarters: Shenzhen, Guangdong, China
- Number of locations: A global presence in more than 100 countries and regions
- Area served: Worldwide
- Key people: Wang Jian (Co-Founder and Chairman)
- Products: DNBseq Platform (next-generation sequencing platform), RT-PCR tests for the detection of the SARS CoV-2 virus and its mutations. Huo-Yan integrated laboratory solution. The NIFTY Test (a non-invasive prenatal test)
- Brands: DNBseq, NIFTY, Huafeiran, Huachangkang, Huajianwei, Huachangan, Huafanan, SeqHPV, PMseq
- Revenue: ▲$251 million (2016)
- Net income: ▲$51.7 million (2016)
- Owner: Wang Jian
- Number of employees: ~ 10,000 (worldwide)
- Divisions: BGI China (Mainland); BGI Asia Pacific; BGI Americas; BGI Europe (Europe and Africa)
- Subsidiaries: BGI Research; FGI; BGI Medicine; BGI Health; BGI Agro; BGI College; GigaScience Press
- Website: en.genomics.cn

BGI Group, formerly Beijing Genomics Institute, is a Chinese genomics company with headquarters in Yantian, Shenzhen. The company was originally formed in 1999 as a genetics research center to participate in the Human Genome Project. It also sequences the genomes of other animals, plants and microorganisms.

BGI has transformed from a small research institute, notable for decoding the DNA of pandas and rice plants, into a diversified company active in animal cloning, health testing, and contract research. BGI's earlier research was continued by the Beijing Institute of Genomics, Chinese Academy of Sciences. BGI Research, the group's nonprofit division, works with the Institute of Genomics and operates the China National GeneBank under a contract with the Chinese government. BGI Genomics, a subsidiary, was listed on the Shenzhen Stock Exchange in 2017. The company is supported by several China Government Guidance Funds and Chinese state-owned enterprises.

Starting in 2021, details came to light about multiple controversies involving the BGI Group. These controversies include alleged collaboration with the People's Liberation Army (PLA) and use of genetic data from prenatal tests. BGI denied that it shares prenatal genetics data with the PLA.

== History ==
=== Beijing Genomics Institute ===
Wang Jian, Yu Jun, Yang Huanming and Liu Siqi created BGI, originally named Beijing Genomics Institute, in September 1999, in Beijing, China as a non-governmental independent research institute in order to participate in the Human Genome Project as China's representative. After the project was completed, funding dried up, after which BGI moved to Hangzhou in exchange for funding from the Hangzhou Municipal Government. In 2002, BGI sequenced the rice genome, which was a cover story in the journal Science. In 2003, BGI decoded the SARS virus genome and created a kit for detection of the virus. In 2003, the Chinese Academy of Sciences founded the Beijing Institute of Genomics in cooperation with BGI, with Yang Huanming as its first director. BGI Hangzhou and the Zhejiang University also founded a new research institute, the James D. Watson Institute of Genome Sciences, Zhejiang University.

=== Spin-off from the Beijing Genomics Institute ===
In 2007, BGI broke away from the Chinese Academy of Sciences, became a private company, and relocated to Shenzhen. Yu Jun left BGI at this time purportedly selling his stake to the other 3 founders for a nominal sum. In 2008, BGI published the first human genome of an Asian individual.

In 2010, BGI bought 128 Illumina HiSeq 2000 gene-sequencing machines, which was backed by US$1.5 billion in "collaborative funds" over the next 10 years from the state lender China Development Bank. By the end of the year, they reportedly had a budget of $30 million. In 2010, BGI Americas was established with its main office in Cambridge, Massachusetts, US, and BGI Europe was established in Copenhagen, Denmark. By 2018, BGI opened offices and laboratories in Seattle and San Jose in US, and London in the UK, as well were founded BGI Asia Pacific with offices in Hong Kong, Kobe (Japan), Bangkok (Thailand), Laos, Singapore, Brisbane (Australia) and many others.

In 2011, BGI reported it employed 4,000 scientists and technicians, and had a $192 million in revenue. BGI did the genome sequencing for the deadly 2011 Germany E. coli O104:H4 outbreak in three days and released it under an open license. Since 2012, it has started to commercialize its services, having investments from China Life Insurance Company, CITIC Group's Goldstone Investment, Jack Ma's Yunfeng Capital, and SoftBank China Capital. That year they also launched their own scientific journal, GigaScience, partnering with BioMed Central to publish data-heavy life science papers. A new partnership was subsequently formed between the GigaScience Press department of BGI and Oxford University Press and since 2017 GigaScience has been co-published with the Oxford University Press. In September 2025 BGI removed the international Editorial, Software and GigaDB teams, and BGI Chief Scientist Xu Xun appointed himself as publisher and editor-in-chief. In November 2025 the majority of the Editorial Board resigned citing concerns the lack of any consultation and concerns about how these changes may affect the journal's long-standing commitment to publishing rigorously reviewed, reproducible research.

In 2013, BGI bought Complete Genomics of Mountain View, California, a major supplier of DNA sequencing technology, for US$118 million, after gaining approval from the Committee on Foreign Investment in the United States. Complete Genomics is a US-based subsidiary of MGI, MGI was a subsidiary of BGI before it was spun out and listed on the Shanghai Stock Exchange in 2022.

In 2015, BGI signed a collaboration with the Zhongshan Hospital' Center for Clinical Precision Medicine in Shanghai, opened in May 2015 with a budget of ¥100 million. They are reportedly being involved as a sequencing institution in China's US$9.2-billion research project for medical care which will last for 15 years. In May 2017, was announced formation of West Coast Innovation Center, co-located in Seattle and San Jose, on the first location planned to work on precision medicine and feature collaborations with University of Washington, the Allen Institute for Brain Science, the Bill & Melinda Gates Foundation, and Washington State University, while on the second's already existing laboratory with 100 employees to develop the next-generation sequencing technologies. In May 2018, reached an agreement with Mount Sinai Hospital (Toronto), Canada, for first installation of BGISEQ platforms in North America.

BGI Genomics, a subsidiary of the group made an initial public offering in July 2017 at Shenzhen Stock Exchange. In 2018, the BGI was reportedly 85.3% owned by Wang Jian, and the group owns 42.4% of its main unit BGI Genomics.

In 2019, it was reported that a BGI subsidiary, Forensic Genomics International, had created a WeChat-enabled database of genetic profiles of people across the country. In July 2020, it was reported that BGI returned a Paycheck Protection Program loan following media scrutiny.

In 2021, state-owned enterprises of State Development and Investment Corporation and China Merchants Group took ownership stakes in BGI Genomics.

==== GigaScience Press ====
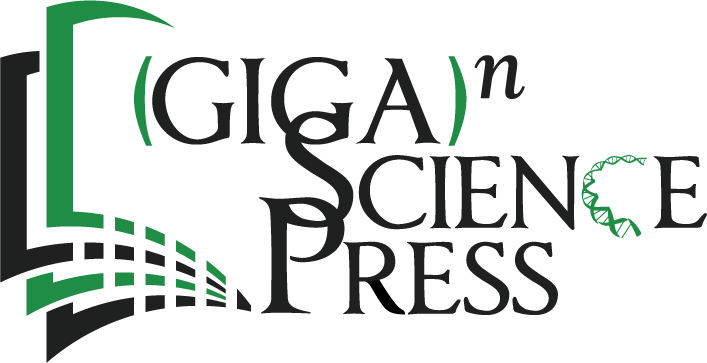
GigaScience Press Logo

GigaScience Press is the Hong Kong-based publishing arm of BGI Group, currently publishing the open access journals GigaScience (co-published with Oxford University Press), GigaByte, and the GigaDB data publishing platform. Focusing on open science, its journals have combined data publishing, transparent open peer review alongside carrying out other experiments in publishing more reproducible papers.

Their journals have won the Association of American Publishers' PROSE Award for Innovation in journal publishing in 2018, and the ALPSP Award for Innovation in Publishing in 2022 for these efforts. In 2025, GigaScience Press won one of the first Crossref Excellence in Metadata awards based on the quality of their metadata.

=== U.S. sanctions ===
In July 2020, the United States Department of Commerce's Bureau of Industry and Security placed two BGI subsidiaries on its Entity List for assisting in alleged human rights abuses due to its genetic analysis work in Xinjiang. In March 2023, the United States Department of Commerce added BGI Research and BGI Tech Solutions (Hongkong) to the Entity List over allegations of surveillance and repression of ethnic minorities.

BGI subsequently hired lobbyists at Steptoe & Johnson to soften language in the National Defense Authorization Act for Fiscal Year 2024 that would prohibit government funding of BGI and its subsidiaries.

As of 2024, BGI is identified in a list by the United States Department of Defense as a Chinese military company operating in the U.S. In April 2024, the United States House Select Committee on Strategic Competition between the United States and the Chinese Communist Party asked the Department of Defense for an explanation for why BGI subsidiaries Innomics and STOmics were not included in the same list. In October 2026, the United States Department of Homeland Security barred imports of BGI products into the U.S. under the Uyghur Forced Labor Prevention Act.

== Research ==
=== E. coli ===
In 2011, BGI sequenced the genome of E. coli bacteria causing an epidemic in Europe to identify genes that lead to resistance to antibiotics.

=== COVID-19 ===
In January 2020, BGI Genomics announced its real-time fluorescent RT-PCR kit that helps in identification of SARS-CoV-2 virus that causes COVID-19. This was subsequently verified and authorized for use in 14 countries and regions, including emergency use listing by the World Health Organization. BGI Genomics reported that by April 2021 the RT-PCR kits had been distributed to more than 180 countries and regions. BGI also developed biosafety level 2 high-throughput nucleic acid detection laboratories, named Huo-Yan laboratories.

In the first half of 2020, BGI Group offered to help the state of California set up COVID-19 testing labs at cost. The government of California rejected the offer due to geopolitical concerns, but Santa Clara County did buy COVID-19 test kits and equipment from BGI.

On 25 August 2020, Reuters reported that about 3,700 people in Sweden were told in error that they had the coronavirus due to a fault in a COVID-19 testing kit from BGI Genomics. Despite being the 5th test to be given WHO Emergency Use Listing, and getting top marks in sensitivity tests in a Dutch study independently validating commercially available tests. BGI Genomics defended the product, blaming differences in thresholds used between labs looking at very low levels of the virus.

=== Bioinformatics technology ===
The annual budget for the computer center was US$9 million. In the same year, BGI's computational biologists developed the first successful algorithm, based on graph theory, for aligning billions of 25 to 75-base pair strings produced by next-generation sequencers, specifically Illumina's Genome Analyzer, during de novo sequencing.

SOAPdenovo is part of "Short Oligonucleotide Analysis Package" (SOAP), a suite of tools developed by BGI for de novo assembly of human-sized genomes, alignment, SNP detection, resequencing, indel finding, and structural variation analysis. Built for the Illumina sequencers' short reads, SOAPdenovo has been used to assemble multiple human genomes (identifying an eight kilobase insertion not detected by mapping to the human reference genome) and animals, like the giant panda.

Up until 2015, BGI had released BGISEQ-100, based on Thermo Fisher Scientific's Ion Torrent device, and BGISEQ-1000, for both of which received an approval from the CFDA for a NIFTY (Non-invasive Fetal Trisomy Test) prenatal test. In October 2015, BGI launched BGISEQ-500, a larger desktop sequencing system. It reportedly received more than 500 orders for the system and run over 112,000 tests until late 2016. The China National GeneBank, opened by BGI and Chinese Government in September 2016, has 150 instruments of the system. The BGISEQ-500 was developed as a sequencing platform capable of competing with Illumina's platforms. In November 2016, BGI launched BGISEQ-50, a miniature version of desktop sequencer. In 2017, BGI began offering WGS for $600. In September 2022, MGI launched DNBSeq-G99, a new ultra-high-speed, mid-to-low throughput sequencer.

In 2021, BGI developed Stereo-seq, its genome wide Spatial transcriptomics technology and released the first research findings from a consortium of scientific users of the technology in 2022. In 2022, BGI-Research and University of Chinese Academy of Sciences together with scientists globally, used sequencing technologies to undertake single cell sequencing to expand the understanding of early human embryonic development, to complete the first whole-body cell atlas of a non-human primate, to complete the world's first body-wide single cell transcriptome atlas of pigs, and to study the brains of ants to explain for the first time how the social division of labor within ant colonies is determined by functional specialization of their brains at cellular levels.

=== Agriculture and biodiversity ===
In 2002, BGI published the genome of the indica variety of rice. In 2014, BGI also collaborated on a project to re-sequence 3,000 rice genomes from 89 countries.

BGI is a member of the international Earth BioGenome Project which aims to sequence the DNA of all known eukaryotic species on Earth. BGI has contributed to the 10KP Genome Sequencing Project, an affiliated project to sequence over 10,000 plant genomes.

=== Animal Kingdom ===
In 2004, BGI was a Member of the International Chicken Genome Consortium that published the genome of the chicken. In 2009, BGI published the genome of the Giant Panda.

In 2014, BGI and scientists from 20 countries worked together to complete the genome-wide sequencing of 48 bird species. In 2020, BGI contributed to the completion of whole genome sequencing of 363 genomes from 92.4% of bird families.

In 2022, BGI led research that published the world's first spatiotemporal map of axolotl brain regeneration. During the same year, a study carried out by BGI, Northeast Forestry University, and other institutions revealed the genomics consequences of inbreeding in the South China tiger by examining its chromosome-scale genomes and comparing it with the Amur tiger.

In 2023, BGI and a scientific consortium jointly published a primate brain cell atlas.

== Legal disputes ==
In 2019, competitor Illumina, Inc. filed multiple patent infringement lawsuits against BGI. In response, BGI has filed patent infringement lawsuits against Illumina alleging violations of federal antitrust and California unfair competition laws. In May 2022 a US court ordered Illumina to pay US$333.8 million to BGI Group after finding that Illumina's DNA-sequencing systems infringed two of BGI's patents. The ruling also stated Illumina infringed the patents willfully, and that three patents it had accused BGI's Complete Genomics subsidiary of infringing were invalid. In July 2022 Illumina and MGI Tech Co. and Complete Genomics, settled US suits on DNA-sequencing technology, with Illumina agreeing to pay $325 million to settle all US litigation. As part of the settlement Illumina will receive a license to the BGI affiliates' patents, and both companies agreed to not sue each other for patent or antitrust violations in the United States for three years.

In a September 2024 testimony before the United States House Select Committee on Strategic Competition between the United States and the Chinese Communist Party, academic Anna B. Puglisi stated that she received legal threats from BGI Group for a report she wrote while serving Georgetown University's Center for Security and Emerging Technology.

== Collaboration with the People's Liberation Army ==
In January 2021, Reuters reported that BGI has worked with the People's Liberation Army (PLA) and affiliated institutions such as the National University of Defense Technology on efforts to enhance soldiers' strength and other projects. In July 2021, Reuters reported that BGI developed a prenatal test, with the assistance of the People's Liberation Army, which is also used for genetic data collection. In an interview with the South China Morning Post, a BGI representative denied the Reuters report. The South China Morning Post stated that BGI published papers with the People's Liberation Army General Hospital and the Army Medical University, explaining in the article that in China "many top-notch hospitals are affiliated with the military." BGI further stated "All NIPT data collected overseas are stored in BGI's laboratory in Hong Kong and are destroyed after five years, as stipulated by General Data Protection Regulation (GDPR)". BGI also stated "BGI has never been asked to provide, nor has it provided data from its NIFTY tests to Chinese authorities for national security or national defense security purposes."

In response to the Reuters report, a German privacy regulator launched a probe of a German company's use of BGI's prenatal genetic tests. In August 2021, the UK announced a registration requirement with the Medicines and Healthcare products Regulatory Agency for BGI's prenatal tests. Regulators in Australia, Estonia, Canada, and Poland also raised concerns as did the U.S. National Counterintelligence and Security Center.

In November 2021, Reuters reported that a University of Copenhagen professor, Guojie Zhang, who was also employed by BGI was developing drugs for the PLA to assist soldiers with managing altitude sickness. BGI stated that the study "was not carried out for military purposes." On 1 December 2021, the University of Copenhagen commented on the Reuters report.

In October 2022, the United States Department of Defense added BGI Genomics Co, a listed subsidiary, to a list of "Chinese military companies" operating in the U.S.

== See also ==
- Chinese National Human Genome Center
- Wellcome Sanger Institute
- Broad Institute
