= Scientific Data (journal) =

- Discipline: Natural sciences
- Language: English

Publication details
- History: 2014-present
- Publisher: Nature Research
- Frequency: Continuous
- Open access: Yes
- License: Creative Commons Attribution 4.0 International Licence
- Impact factor: 7.2 (2025)

Standard abbreviations
- ISO 4: Sci. Data

Indexing
- ISSN: 2052-4463
- OCLC no.: 880900611

Links
- Journal homepage

Scientific Data is a peer-reviewed open access scientific journal published by Nature Research since 2014. It focuses on descriptions of data sets relevant to the natural sciences, medicine, engineering and social sciences, which are provided as machine-readable data, complemented with a human oriented narrative. The journal was not the first to publish data papers, but is one of a few journals whose content consists primarily of data papers. The journal is abstracted and indexed by Index Medicus/MEDLINE/PubMed.
