= MGI (company) =

Chinese biotechnology company

MGI Tech
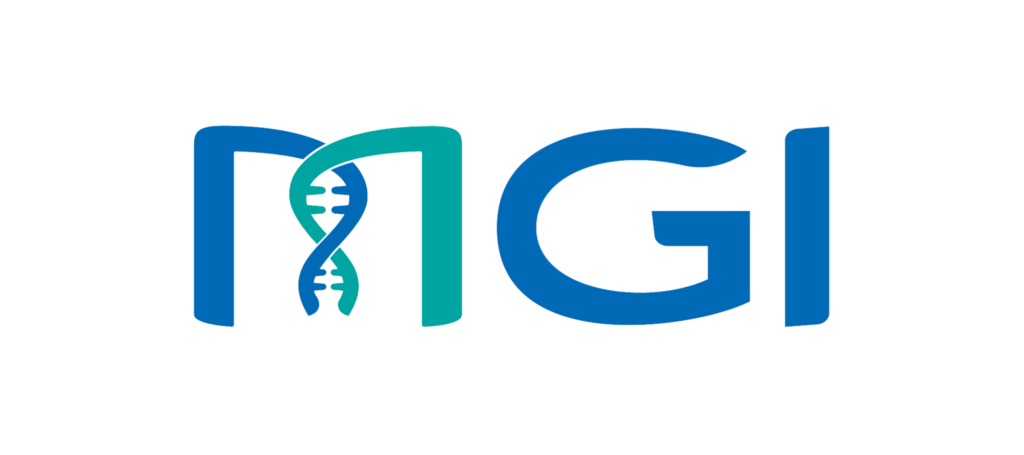

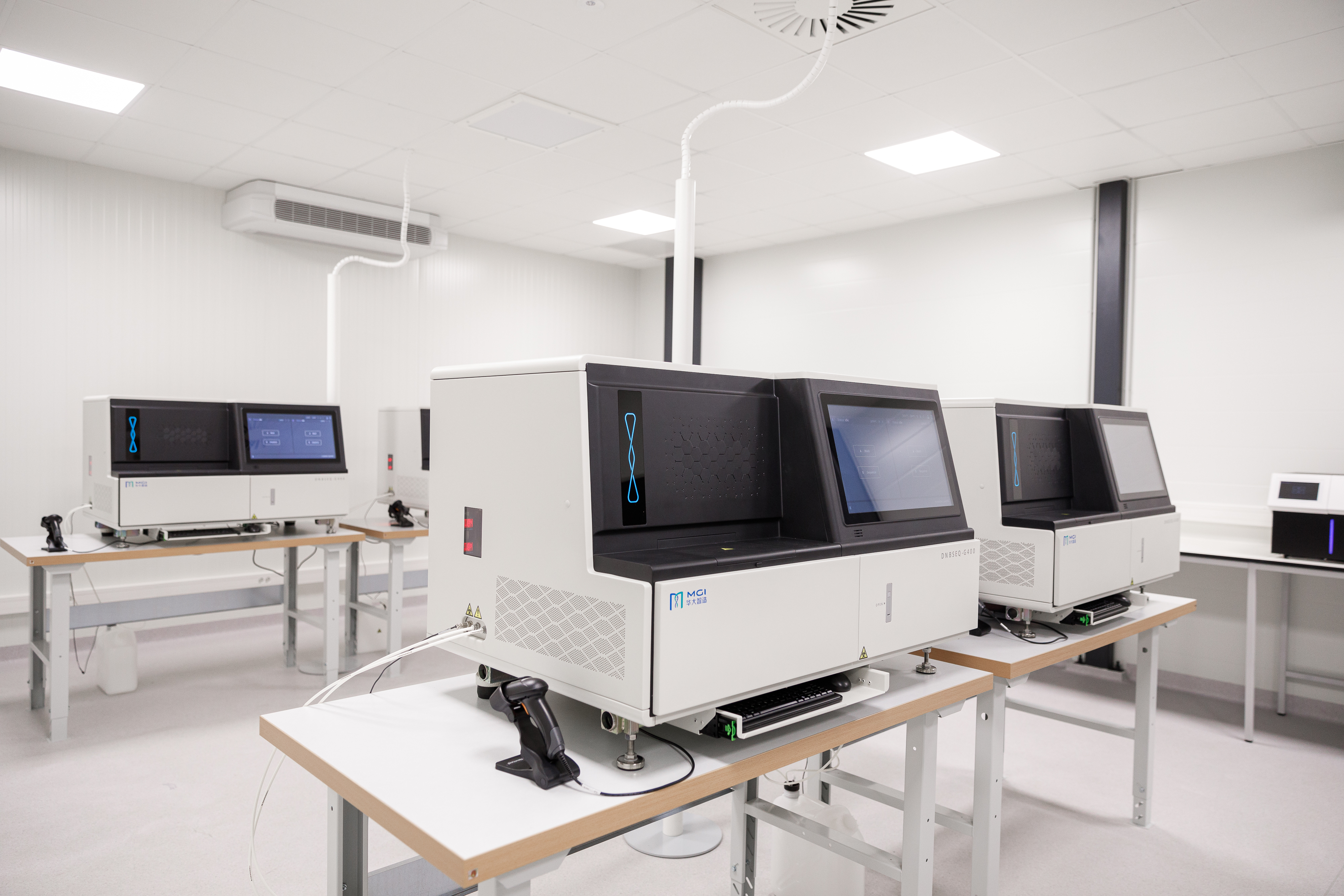
- MGI's DNBSEQ-G400, a high-throughput DNA sequencing set
- Native name: 深圳华大智造科技股份有限公司
- Type: Public
- Traded as: SSE: 688114
- Industry: Biotechnology
- Founded: 2016; 10 years ago
- Headquarters: Shenzhen, China
- Area served: Worldwide
- Number of employees: 2,050
- Parent: MGI Tech
- Subsidiaries: Complete Genomics
- Website: www.mgi-tech.com

MGI or MGI Tech is a Chinese biotechnology company, which provides a line of products and technologies that serves the genetic sequencing, genotyping and gene expression, and proteomics markets. Its headquarters are located in Shenzhen, Guangdong, China.

== History ==
In 2016, MGI was founded as a subsidiary of BGI Group. It manufactures high-throughput genetic sequencing systems and other products for use in the life sciences and health care sectors. As of July 2022, the company's operation is divided into two primary business segments: genetic sequencers and laboratory automation systems.

MGI was a subsidiary of BGI Group before, it was spun out and listed on the Shanghai stock exchange in 2022.

In May 2020, MGI raised $1 billion in series B funding from IDG Capital and CPE China Fund. In December 2020, the company submitted its IPO application to Shanghai Stock Exchange STAR Market. In September 2021, the company has won the approval for its IPO on Shanghai Stock Exchange STAR Market's high-tech board.

In 2024, MGI lost more than a third of its market capitalization after the US Congress introduced legislation to prohibit American health data being sent to China.

In 2024, MGI opens Customer Experience Center in Brazil.

In 2025, Swiss biotech incubator firm Swiss Rockets has entered into an exclusive licensing agreement with MGI Tech and its US subsidiary Complete Genomics granting the company the rights to develop and commercialize next-generation sequencers based on the MGI Tech/Complete Genomics' CoolMPS technology in most parts of the world.

In October 2026, the United States Department of Homeland Security barred imports of MGI products into the U.S. under the Uyghur Forced Labor Prevention Act.

== Subsidiaries ==
=== Complete Genomics ===
In March 2013, Complete Genomics was acquired by BGI Group. After the acquisition, Complete Genomics moved to San Jose, and in June 2018 became part of MGI. The acquisition was one of the outcomes of $1.5 billion 'collaborative funds' i.e., '10 years loan' which was initially provided by China Development Bank to acquire all 128 of Illumina, Inc.'s newest and fastest next-generation sequencers including HiSeq 2000.

== Research and development ==
The company is known for manufacturing DNA sequencers based on low-cost DNA nanoball sequencing technologies which was refined further after the acquisition of Complete Genomics. The refinement included combinatorial probe anchor synthesis technologies which involves loading DNA nanoballs (DNBs) onto a patterned array chip using a fluidic system. Subsequently, a sequencing primer is added to the adaptor region of the DNBs in order to hybridize them.

In 2023, MGI dubbed DNBSEQ-T20 which can read up to 50,000 human genomes a year. And the cost of reading each genome will be as low as $100.

In 2025, MGI Tech unveils DNBSEQ-T1+. The DNBSEQ-T1+ is a next-generation mid-throughput sequencer that completes a paired end 150 sequencing workflow in just 24 hours with Q40 accuracy.

In 2025, MGI Tech touts world’s fastest gene sequencer: 10 minutes to read a genome. The company said at a launch event that the DNBSEQ-T7+ can sequence 144 human genomes a day, or one every 10 minutes.

== Criticism ==
On October 31, 2019, the Chairman of the Senate Finance Committee, Chuck Grassley, and Senator Marco Rubio wrote a joint letter to Alex Azar, the Secretary of the Department of Health and Human Services and Seema Verma, the Administrator of the Centers for Medicare & Medicaid Services (CMS) raised their concerns against MGI, regarding the circumstances under which the CMS may finance it to process American citizens' genomic or exome data.

MGI asserted that it is "a supplier of instruments and consumables for customers to use in their own labs" and does not provide any genomic sequencing services. "MGI does not own, control, handle, or even access samples or genetic data, only MGI's customers do. There is no risk that MGI will have access to any health records or genetic data from customers," the company stated.

== Litigation ==
=== Patents infringement lawsuit ===
In November 2021, a federal jury in California concluded that MGI America (in its capacity as an affiliate of BGI Group) had infringed Illumina, Inc.'s patents. Accordingly, they awarded Illumina damages of $8 million.

In March 2022, Illumina persuaded a U.S. District Judge to prolong the restriction on MGI America selling its CoolMPS sequencers in the United States for six months until August 2022, when Illumina's patent expires.

=== "Two-channel" DNA sequencing lawsuit ===
Complete Genomics, a research subsidiary of MGI, filed a lawsuit in May 2019, alleging that Illumina's "two-channel" DNA sequencing chemistry violates two patents for the technology that deduces the identification of each nucleotide from two signals. The NovaSeq 6000, the NextSeq 500/550/550x, and 1000/2000 Series, as well as the MiniSeq, were all the focus of the lawsuit against Illumina. Additionally, it targeted Illumina's cluster generation & sequencing, and library preparation kits, all of which are interoperable with one or more platforms.

In May 2022, a jury in Delaware concluded that Illumina's "two-channel" sequencing chemistry infringes on two patents owned by MGI Tech through its subsidiary Complete Genomics. As a result of this finding, the jury awarded $333.8 million in damages to the company. The jury also dismissed Illumina's assertions that the patents were invalid. The verdict also invalidated three of Illumina's patents that the firm had asserted in a countersuit claiming MGI Tech had infringed on Illumina's patents.
