= RNA velocity =

Concept in molecular biology

RNA velocity is a way of measuring the changes in gene expression. It is derived from ratio of spliced to unspliced RNA in the cell over time. Monitoring this value over time allows to see if the gene of interest is induced or repressed. It can be used to predict future changes in gene expression or cell differentiation

== Principles and kinetic model ==
Simplified two-pool kinetic model of RNA velocity. Transcription produces unspliced RNA (u), splicing converts it into mature RNA (s), and degradation removes mature RNA. The equations describe changes in RNA abundance over time.

During transcription, unspliced precursor RNA transcripts contain both introns and exons. Splicing removes introns to create mature RNA. Mature RNA eventually degrades within the cell. Because there is a kinetic delay between transcripts being produced and spliced before entering the pool of mature RNA, the unspliced RNA responds earlier to changes in transcription compared to the entire pool of mature RNA yet to be degraded. Comparing the abundances of unspliced and mature transcripts of a gene relative to an expected kinetic relationship can help predict whether levels of certain mature transcripts will increase or decrease.

$\frac{du}{dt}=\alpha-\beta u$

$\frac{ds}{dt}=\beta u-\gamma s$

The above differential equations are simplified equations used to model the kinetics of the lifecycle of a transcript (transcription, splicing, degradation). u and s represent the abundance of unspliced and spliced transcripts of a gene, respectively. α represents the rate of transcription, or the creation of unspliced transcripts. β represents the splicing rate constant, and therefore βu represents the rate at which unspliced transcripts, u, are converted into spliced transcripts, s. γ represents the degradation rate constant, and therefore γs represents the rate at which spliced transcripts, s, are destroyed. du/dt represents the rate of change in the abundance of unspliced transcripts, which increases with increased transcription and decreases with increased splicing. ds/dt represents the rate of change in the abundance of spliced transcripts, which increases with increased splicing and decreases with increased degradation. The RNA velocity for a gene of interest is the estimated ds/dt value for that gene, where a positive value represents an increase in mature RNA and a negative value indicates a decrease in mature RNA.

The calculated RNA velocity for several genes can be combined into a single velocity vector for the cell. The velocity vector can then be used to estimate the direction of the cell's movement in transcriptional state space. These predicted movements can be visualized in low-dimensional embeddings such as UMAP, PCA, or t-SNE. Because cells are destroyed in the RNA-sequencing process, these predictions are inferences, not observed dynamics. The equations used to model transcription, splicing, and degradation make assumptions to simplify calculations, which can limit the accuracy of predictions when those assumptions are violated. Another limitation of RNA velocity is the technical noise in single-cell RNA-seq data that can distort real biological signals. Incomplete sampling can also weaken interpretation if the sequenced cells do not represent all states associated with a cellular process of interest.

== Software usage ==
There are several software tools available for RNA velocity analysis. Each of these tools has its own strengths and applications, so the choice of tool would depend on the specific requirements of analysis:

=== velocyto ===
Velocyto is a package for the analysis of expression dynamics in single cell RNA seq data. In particular, it enables estimations of RNA velocities of single cells by distinguishing unspliced and spliced mRNAs in standard single-cell RNA sequencing protocols. It is the first paper proposed the concept of RNA velocity. Velocyto works by solving the proposed differential equations for each gene.

=== scVelo ===
scVelo is a method that solves the full transcriptional dynamics of splicing kinetics using a likelihood-based dynamical model. This generalizes RNA velocity to systems with transient cell states, which are common in development and in response to perturbations. scVelo was applied to understanding subpopulation kinetics in neurogenesis and pancreatic hormone secretion.

=== cellDancer ===
cellDancer is a scalable deep neural network that locally infers velocity for each cell from its neighbors and then relays a series of local velocities to provide single-cell resolution inference of velocity kinetics. Unlike previous models it does not infer the same velocity values for all the cells in the experiment.

=== MultiVelo ===
MultiVelo is a differential equation model of gene expression that extends the RNA velocity framework to incorporate epigenomic data. MultiVelo uses a probabilistic latent variable model to estimate the switch time and rate parameters of chromatin accessibility and gene expression .

=== DeepVelo ===
DeepVelo is a neural network–based ordinary differential equation that can model transcriptome dynamics by describing continuous-time gene expression changes within individual cells. DeepVelo has been applied to public datasets from different sequencing platforms to (i) formulate transcriptome dynamics on different time scales, (ii) measure the instability of cell states, and (iii) identify developmental driver genes via perturbation analysis.

=== UnitVelo ===
UnitVelo is a statistical framework of RNA velocity that models the dynamics of spliced and unspliced RNAs via flexible transcription activities. UnitVelo supports the inference of a unified latent time across the transcriptome.
