= China National GeneBank =

Chinese gene storage bank

Coordinates: 22°35′25.17″N 114°27′36.78″E

Content
- Organisms: all
- Release date: 22 September 2016

Access
- Website: http://www.cngb.org/

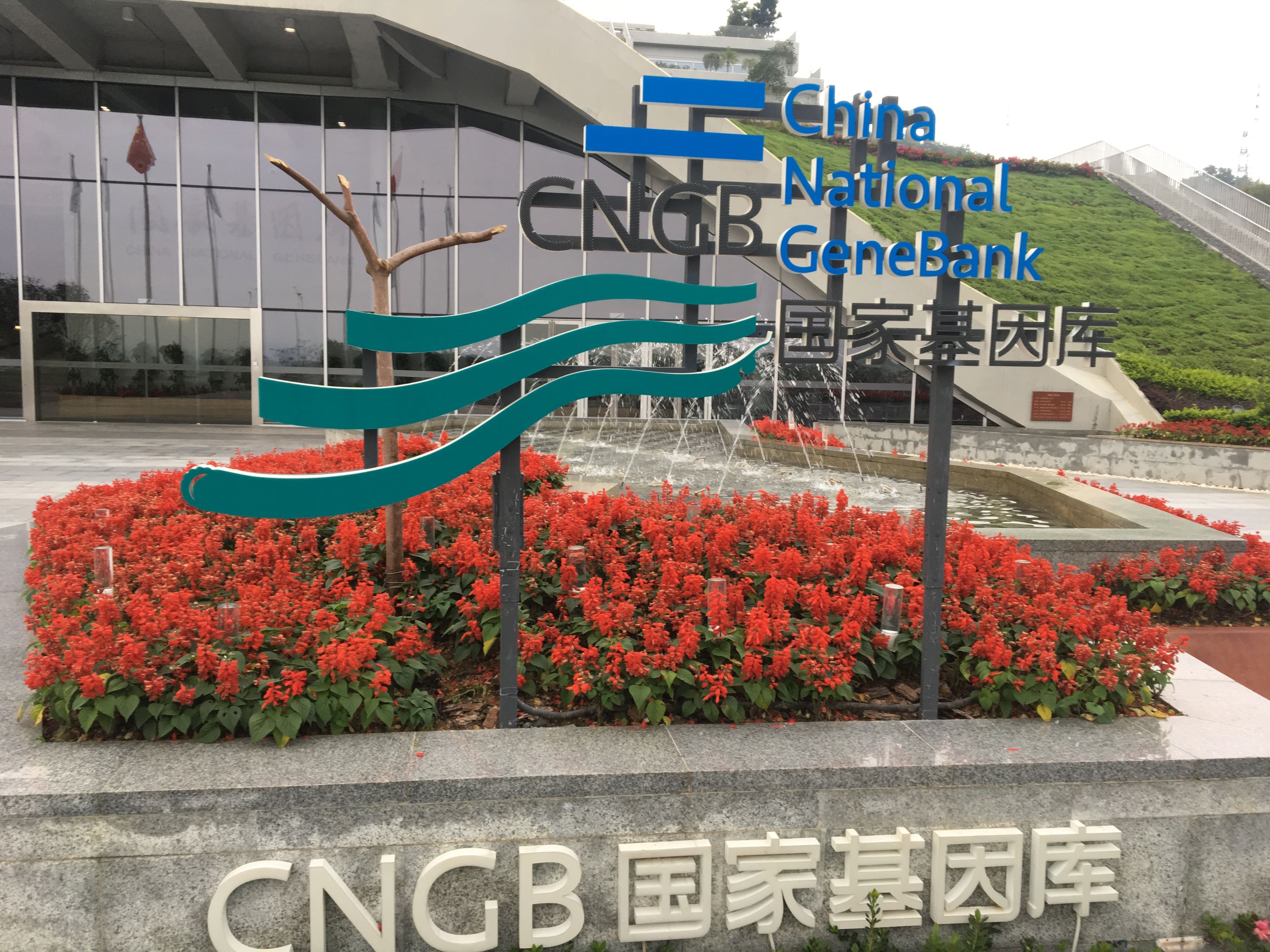
China National GeneBank building located at the Dapeng Peninsula

China National GeneBank or CNGB (Chinese: 国家基因库) is China's first national-level gene storage bank, approved and funded by the Chinese government. Based in the Dapeng Peninsula of Shenzhen, CNGB's mission is to support public welfare, life science research and innovation, as well as industry incubation, through effective bioresource conservation, digitalization and utilization.

In 2011 the Chinese National Development and Reform Commission (NDRC), Ministry of Finance, Ministry of Industry and Information Technology, and Ministry of Health and Family Planning approved the establishment of the Centre, entrusting BGI with its construction in a public-private partnership. After 5-years of development the first phase of the centre opened in September 2016, spanning more than 47,500 square meters and including a biorepository, a bioinformatics data center and a living biobank. The Centre also has a Synthetic Biology platform collaborating with Australia's Macquarie University and Harvard on metabolic engineering and the development of high-density DNA storage technology.

== See also ==
- Australia Bioinformatics Resource
- Australian Grains Genebank
- DNA Data Bank of Japan (DDBJ)
- European Bioinformatics Institute (EBI)
- National Center for Biotechnology Information (NCBI)
- Svalbard Global Seed Vault
- Swiss Institute of Bioinformatics (Expasy)
- Ruili Botanical Garden
