= GigaScience =

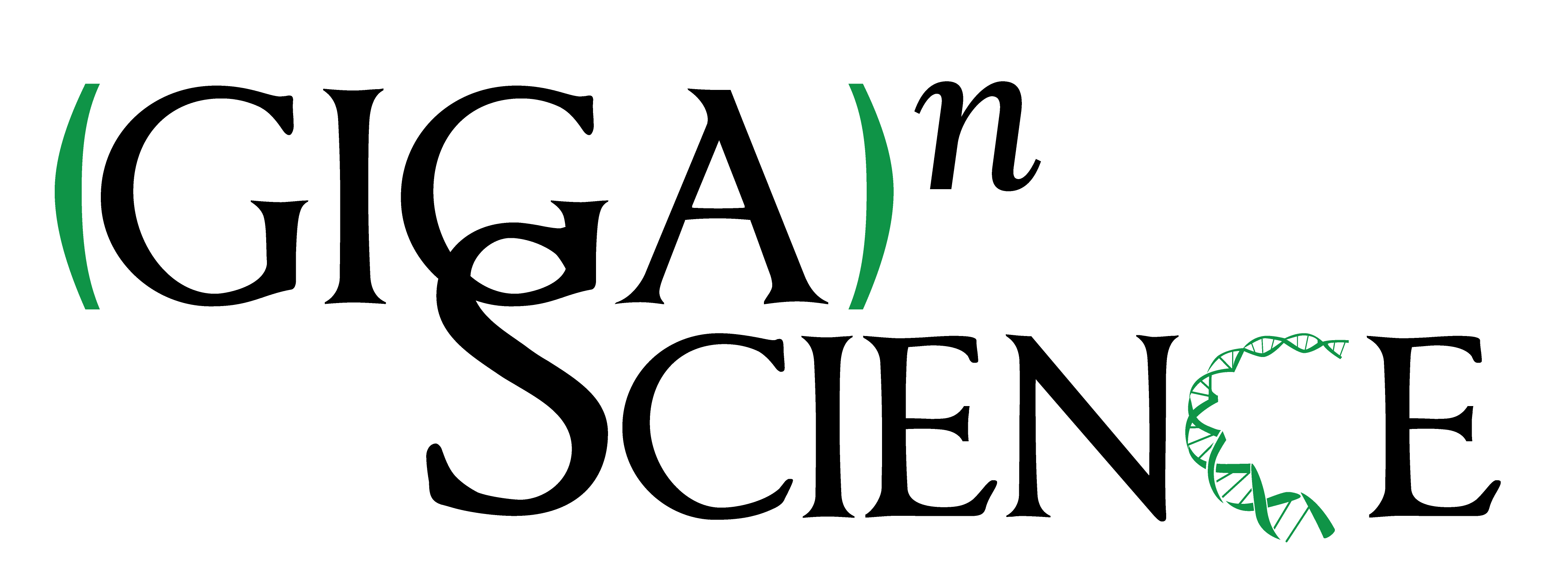
- Discipline: Life sciences
- Language: English
- Edited by: Xu Xun

Publication details
- History: Since 2012
- Publisher: Oxford University Press and the Beijing Genomics Institute
- Frequency: Continuous
- Open access: Yes
- License: Creative Commons Attribution 4.0
- Impact factor: 3.9 (2024)

Standard abbreviations
- ISO 4: GigaScience

Indexing
- CODEN: GIGABJ
- ISSN: 2047-217X
- LCCN: 2013243152
- OCLC no.: 835660742

Links
- Journal homepage; Online access

GigaScience is a peer-reviewed scientific journal that was established in 2012. It covers research and large data-sets that result from work in the biomedical and life sciences. Originally, the journal was co-published by BioMed Central and the Beijing Genomics Institute (BGI). In 2016, it left BioMed Central to form a new partnership between the GigaScience Press department of BGI and Oxford University Press. In 2018, GigaScience won the Association of American Publishers' PROSE Award for Innovation in journal publishing in the multidisciplinary category. In September 2025 BGI removed the international Editorial, Software and GigaDB curation teams, and Chief Scientist of BGI Group Xu Xun took over as publisher and editor-in-chief. Due to the lack of consultation or communication with the editors or editorial board, in November 2025 the majority of the board resigned citing concerns about how these changes may affect the journal’s long-standing commitment to publishing rigorously reviewed, reproducible research.

== GigaDB and GigaGalaxy ==
In order to host the large data-sets the journal covers, GigaScience has built and integrated its own disciplinary repository: GigaDB. The journal also provides a Galaxy-based platform to analyze data, GigaGalaxy. The journal has tried to promote the use of Galaxy pipelines as publishable research outputs through its 'Galaxy Series' of articles.

== Abstracting and indexing ==
The journal is abstracted and indexed by Index Medicus/MEDLINE/PubMed, the Science Citation Index Expanded, CAS, CNKI, EMBASE and Scopus. According to the Journal Citation Reports, the journal has a 2024 impact factor of 3.9.
