= Yang Huanming =

Chinese biologist

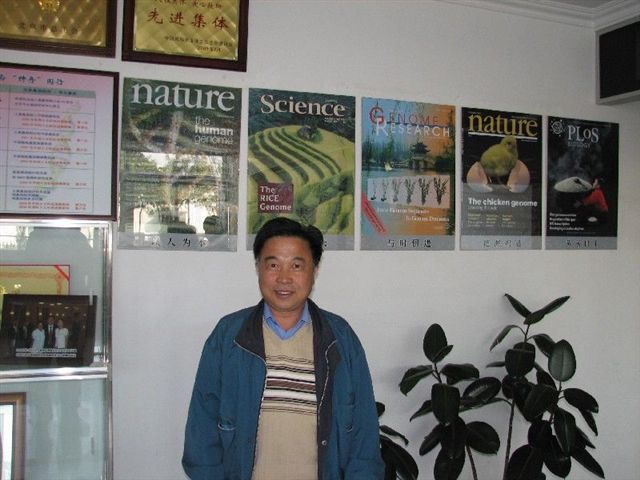
Yang Huanming

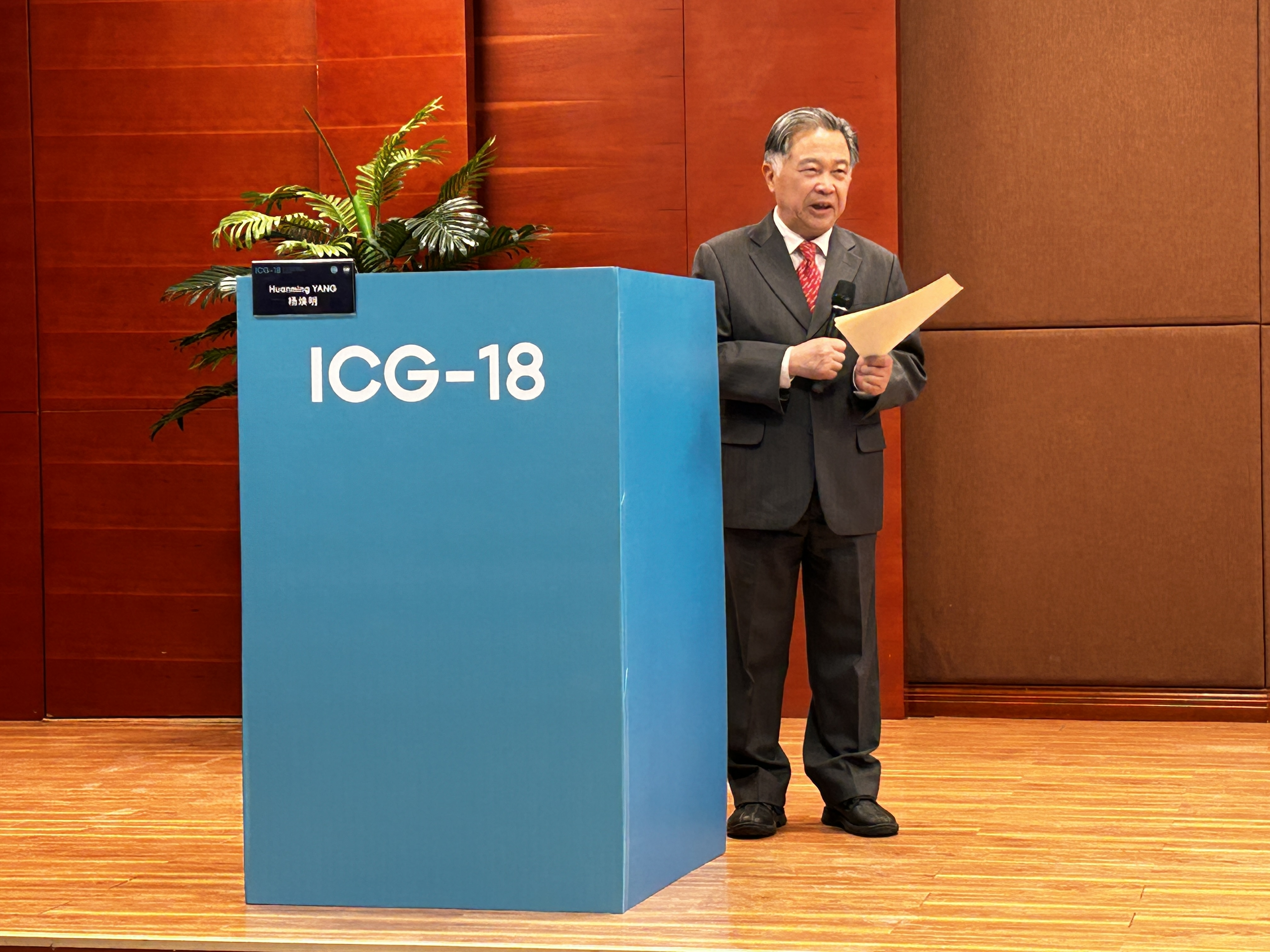
Yang Huanming in 2023 at the ICG-18 conference in Hunan

Yang Huanming (Chinese: 杨焕明; born 6 October 1952) is a Chinese biologist, businessman and one of China's leading genetics researchers. He is Chairman and co-founder of the Beijing Genomics Institute, formerly of the Chinese Academy of Sciences. He was elected as member of the Chinese Academy of Sciences in 2007, a foreign academician of Indian National Science Academy in 2009, a member of the German National Academy of Sciences in 2012, and foreign associate of the US National Academy of Science in 2014.

== Early life and education ==
Yang was born on 6 October 1952, near Wenzhou, Zhejiang, China. He received his B.Sc. from Hangzhou University (now part of Zhejiang University) in 1978, followed by a master's degree in biology in 1982 from the Nanjing Railroad Medical Institute (now Southeast University). Yang earned his Ph.D. in 1988 from the Institute of Medical Genetics of University of Copenhagen, Denmark. He then completed his post-doctoral training in Europe (at CIML, INSERM/CNRS, Marseille, France, 1988–90) and the United States (at Harvard Medical School and UCLA, 1990–94).

== Research ==
Yang's work include the mapping and cloning of human genes, the sequencing and analysis of the human genome, human genome diversity and evolution, and the ethical, legal, and social issues related to genome research. The study of Yang and his collaborators at the Beijing Genomics Institute on the rice genome made the cover of the April 5, 2002, issue of Science magazine. Yang led a 2001 UNESCO sponsored symposium held in Hangzhou on research ethics that focused on some questionable research projects by foreign researchers in Anhui Province and on strengthening the protection of human research subjects in China. With his interest in bioethics, Yang was the only Chinese appointee on International Research Panel of President Obama's Presidential Commission for the Study of Bioethical issues in 2011 investigating the 1940s Guatemala syphilis experiment. From 1998 to 2001 he was member of UNESCO's International Bioethics Committee (UNESCO-IBC).

A long running advocate of data sharing, during his participation on the UNESCO-IBC he issued a statement stressing the need for free access to DNA sequences and protested against the monopolization of scientific advances by private firms such as Celera. UNESCO subsequently issuing a similar statement which was then endorsed by the General Assembly of the United Nations partly through his persistent efforts.

Yang led China's participation in the international Human Genome Project. Yang is a member of the Chinese Academy of Sciences. He was also Coordinator-in-China of the International HapMap Consortium and Chief Coordinator of the Chinese Hybrid Rice Genome Consortium. Yang was Secretary-General of the Chinese Human Genome Project (CHGP), Secretary-General of the Human Genome Diversity Committee, and Secretary-General of the Committee of Ethical, Legal, and Social Issues (ELSI), CHGP.

Yang is also a member of Collegium International, an organization of leaders with political, scientific, and ethical expertise whose goal is to provide new approaches in overcoming the obstacles in the way of a peaceful, socially just and an economically sustainable world.

== Beijing Genomics Institute ==
Yang is co-Founder, Director and Chairman of an institute that has a dual public-private nature since it first established with the help of Wenzhou business people as the Huada Genomics Research Institute (or Beijing Genomics Institute in English) and then later received Chinese government support as the Beijing Genomics Institute of the Chinese Academy of Sciences. Unusual for when it was an institute of the Chinese Academy of Sciences, 80% of the then 500 research positions at the BGI laboratories in Beijing and Hangzhou were supported through competitive grants from both Chinese and foreign sources. In 2007 BGI split from the Chinese Academy of Sciences and moved their headquarters to Shenzhen as the first citizen-managed, non-profit research institution in China.
