= PubGene =

Bioinformatics company located in Oslo, Norway

PubGene Inc.
- Company type: Privately held
- Industry: Bio-informatics
- Founded: 2001
- Headquarters: Boston, United States
- Area served: Global
- Key people: Eirik Næss-Ulseth (CEO)
- Services: Bioinformatics
- Website: www.pubgene.com

PubGene AS is a bioinformatics company located in Oslo, Norway and is the daughter company of PubGene Inc.

In 2001, PubGene founders demonstrated one of the first applications of text mining to research in biomedicine (i.e., biomedical text mining). They went on to create the PubGene public search engine, exemplifying the approach they pioneered by presenting biomedical terms as graphical networks based on their co-occurrence in MEDLINE texts. The PubGene search engine has since been discontinued and incorporated into a commercial product. Co-occurrence networks provide a visual overview of possible relationships between terms and facilitate medical literature retrieval for relevant sets of articles implied by the network display. Commercial applications of the technology are available.

Original development of PubGene technologies was undertaken in collaboration between the Norwegian Cancer Hospital (Radiumhospitalet) and the Norwegian University of Science and Technology. The work is supported by the Research Council of Norway and commercialization assisted by Innovation Norway.

PubGene provides CoreMine Medical as a service open to the public.
