= C1orf186 =

Human regulatory protein

Chromosome 1 open reading frame 186 (C1orf186) is the protein encoding the regulation of hemoglobinization and erythroid cell expansion(RHEX) gene.

== Gene ==
C1orf186 has a cytogenetic location of 1q32.1, contains one transmembrane domain located near the beginning of the translated region, and 7 exons. The gene spans 1205 base pairs.

== Protein ==
C1orf186 has an estimated molecular weight of 19.4 kDa, and a theoretical pI of 4.76. It is targeted by erythropoietin signaling, which controls erythroid cell expansion and the final stages of erythroblast development.

=== Protein structure ===
C1orf186 is predicted to have a large alpha helix at the beginning of the translated region, and 4 beta strands towards the end.

== Regulation ==
=== Gene level pegulation ===
In humans, RHEX is highly expressed in the kidney and lymph tissues with lower, but still significant expression in the pancreas, liver, and lungs. According to Human Protein Atlas, the highest expression is found in the cervix in females and the seminal vesicles in males.

=== Protein level regulation ===
Human Protein Atlas predicts C1orf186 expression to be localized to the plasma membrane. There are 3 phosphorylation sites found within the translated region of the C1orf186 protein, which are involved in signal transduction pathways.

== Homology ==
=== Orthologs and paralogs ===
Non-mammalian orthologs have been found in alligators, turtles, and flighted and flightless birds. C1orf186 has mammalian orthologs found most distantly in marsupials. There are no known paralogs of C1orf186 within humans.

C1orf186 Orthologs
Scientific name	Common name	Median Date of Divergence(MYA)	Sequence length(aa)	Percent Similarity to Human	Percent identity to Human
Homo sapiens	Humans	0	172	100	100
Carlito syrichta	Philippine Tarsier	69	172	77.9	68.6
Delphinapterus leucas	Beluga Whale	94	172	76.7	66.9
Rhinolophus sinicus	Chinese Rufous Horseshoe Bat	94	175	77.1	65.1
Monodelphis domestica	Grey Short-Tailed Opossum	160	202	45.7	31.9
Gallus gallus	Red Junglefowl	319	159	36.5	25.4
Apteryx rowi	Ōkārito Kiwi	319	148	39.6	27.1
Dermochelys coriacea	Leatherback Sea Turtle	319	65	23.3	16.3
Alligator mississippiensis	American Alligator	319	62	23.3	16.3

== Post-translational modifications ==
3 phosphorylation sites were experimentally determined, further indicating C1orf186's involvement in differentiation and protein-protein interactions. An N-myristoylation site has also been identified towards the beginning of the protein's translated region.

== Interacting proteins ==
SH3GL1: C1orf186 was found to interact with SH3GL1, and as SH3GL1 is implicated in endocytosis helps to point towards a subcellular localization of the plasma membrane for C1orf186. This interaction was determined via two-hybrid assay from an IMEx database.

JP-1: C1orf186 was determined to interact with JP-1 via affinity chromatography from a BioGrid database. JP-1 helps to form junctional membrane complexes.

== Clinical significance ==
Duplications of C1orf186 is associated with slopes of cognitive decline as well as increased cognitive resilience among individuals with Alzheimer's Disease.

The most variant of the RHEX gene includes an insertion and deletion mutation identified by NCBI as variant rs555500075, and occurs within 43.8% of the sampled genes containing this variation.
