= MatrixDB =

Content
- Description: extracellular matrix interactions database.
- Data types captured: Interactions DataBase, Biochemestry, Biacore, SPR
- Organisms: All (Human only possible)

Contact
- Laboratory: IBCP - UMR5086 CNRS / Univ Lyon1 - FRANCE
- Authors: Emilie Chautard, Guillaume Launay, Nicolas Thierry-Mieg, Romain Salza, Franck Peysselon, Marie Fatoux-Ardore, Sofiane Badaoui, Sylvain Vallet, Lionel Ballut, Dorian Multedo, Sylvie Ricard-Blum.
- Primary citation: PMID 20852260

Access
- Standards: PSI-MI
- Website: http://matrixdb.univ-lyon1.fr

MatrixDB is a biological database focused on molecular interactions between extracellular proteins and polysaccharides. MatrixDB takes into account the multimeric nature of the extracellular proteins (for example, collagens, laminins and thrombospondins are multimers). The database was initially released in 2009 and is maintained by the research group of Sylvie Ricard-Blum at UMR5246, Claude Bernard University Lyon 1.

MatrixDB is linked with UniGene and the Human Protein Atlas. It also allows users to build customised tissue- and disease-specific interaction networks, which can be further analysed and visualised using Cytoscape or Medusa.

MatrixDB is an active member of the International Molecular Exchange Consortium (IMEx), a group of the major public providers of interaction data. Other participating databases include the Biomolecular Interaction Network Database (BIND), IntAct, the Molecular Interaction Database (MINT), MIPS, MPact, and BioGRID. The databases of IMEx work together to prevent duplications of effort, collecting data from non-overlapping sources and sharing the curated interaction data. The IMEx consortium also worked to develop the HUPO-PSI-MI XML standard format for annotating and exchanging interaction data. MatrixDB includes interaction data extracted from the literature by manual curation and offers access to relevant data involving extracellular proteins provided by IMEx partner databases through the PSICQUIC webservice, as well as data from the Human Protein Reference Database.
