= Temporal information retrieval =

Area of research related to information retrieval centered on timeliness

Temporal information retrieval (T-IR) is an emerging area of research related to the field of information retrieval (IR) and a considerable number of sub-areas, positioning itself, as an important dimension in the context of the user information needs.

According to information theory science (Metzger, 2007), timeliness or currency is one of the key five aspects that determine a document's credibility besides relevance, accuracy, objectivity and coverage. One can provide many examples when the returned search results are of little value due to temporal problems such as obsolete data on weather, outdated information about a given company's earnings or information on already-happened or invalid predictions.

T-IR, in general, aims at satisfying these temporal needs and at combining traditional notions of document relevance with the so-called temporal relevance. This will enable the return of temporally relevant documents, thus providing a temporal overview of the results in the form of timeliness or similar structures. It also shows to be very useful for query understanding, query disambiguation, query classification, result diversification and so on.

This article contains a list of the most important research in temporal information retrieval (T-IR) and its related sub-areas. As several of the referred works are related with different research areas a single article can be found in more than one different table. For ease of reading the articles are categorized in a number of different sub-areas referring to its main scope, in detail.

== Temporal dynamics (T-dynamics) ==
Reference	Year	Conference/Journal	Main Scope	Comments
Baeza, Y. (2002). Web Structure, Dynamics and Page Quality. In A. Laendar & A. Oliveira (Eds.), In Lecture Notes in Computer Science - SPIRE2002: 9th International Symposium on String Processing and Information Retrieval (Vol. 2476/2002, pp. 117 – 130). Lisbon, Portugal. September 11–13: Springer Berlin / Heidelberg.	2002	SPIRE	T-Dynamics	
Cho, J., & Garcia-Molina, H. (2003). Estimating Frequency of Change. In TOIT: ACM Transactions on Internet Technology, 3(3), 256 - 290.	2003	TOIT	T-Dynamics	
A Large-Scale Study of the Evolution of Web Pages]. In WWW2003: Proceedings of the 12th International World Wide Web Conference (pp. 669 – 678). Budapest, Hungary. May 20–24: ACM Press.	2003	WWW	T-Dynamics	
Ntoulas, A., Cho, J., & Olston, C. (2004). What's New on the Web?: the Evolution of the Web from a Search Engine Perspective. In WWW2004: Proceedings of the 13th International World Wide Web Conference (pp. 1 – 12). New York, NY, United States. May 17–22: ACM Press.	2004	WWW	T-Dynamics	
Vlachos, M., Meek, C., Vagena, Z., & Gunopulos, D. (2004). Identifying Similarities, Periodicities and Bursts for Online Search Queries. In SIGMOD2004: Proceedings of the International Conference on Management of Data (pp. 131 – 142). Paris, France. June 13–18: ACM Press.	2004	SIGMOD	T-Dynamics	
Beitzel, S. M., Jensen, E. C., Chowdhury, A., Frieder, O., & Grossman, D. (2007). Temporal analysis of a very large topically categorized Web query log. In JASIST: Journal of the American Society for Information Science and Technology, 58(2), 166 - 178.	2007	JASIST	T-Dynamics	
Jones, R., & Diaz, F. (2007). Temporal Profiles of Queries. In TOIS: ACM Transactions on Information Systems, 25(3). Article No.: 14.	2007	TOIS	TQ-Understanding	
Bordino, I., Boldi, P., Donato, D., Santini, M., & Vigna, S. (2008). Temporal Evolution of the UK Web. In ADN2008: Proceedings of the 1st International Workshop on Analysis of Dynamic Networks associated to ICDM2008: IEEE International Conference on Data Mining (pp. 909 – 918). Pisa, Italy. December 19: IEEE Computer Society Press.	2008	ICDM - ADN	T-Dynamics	
Adar, E., Teevan, J., Dumais, S. T., & Elsas, J. L. (2009). The Web Changes Everything: Understanding the Dynamics of Web Content. In WSDM2009: Proceedings of the 2nd ACM International Conference on Web Search and Data Mining (pp. 282 – 291). Barcelona, Spain. February 9–12: ACM Press.	2009	WSDM	T-Dynamics	
Metzler, D., Jones, R., Peng, F., & Zhang, R. (2009). Improving Search Relevance for Implicitly Temporal Queries. In SIGIR 2009: Proceedings of the 32nd Annual International ACM SIGIR Conference on Research and Development in Information Retrieval (pp. 700 – 701). Boston, MA, United States. July 19–23: ACM Press.	2009	SIGIR	TQ-Understanding	
Elsas, J. L., & Dumais, S. T. (2010). Leveraging Temporal Dynamics of Document Content in Relevance Ranking. In WSDM10: Third ACM International Conference on Web Search and Data Mining (pp. 1 – 10). New York, United States. February 3–06: ACM Press.	2010	WSDM	T-Dynamics	
Jatowt, A., Kawai, H., Kanazawa, K., Tanaka, K., & Kunieda, K. (2010). Analyzing Collective View of Future, Time-referenced Events on the Web. In WWW2010: Proceedings of the 19th International World Wide Web Conference (pp. 1123 – 1124). Raleigh, United States. April 26–30: ACM Press.	2010	WWW	F-IRetrieval	
Aji, A., Agichtein, E. (2010). Deconstructing Interaction Dynamics in Knowledge Sharing Communities. In : Third International Conference on Social Computing, Behavioral-Cultural Modeling, & Prediction (pp. 273 – 281). Washington DC, United States. March 30–31: Springer-Verlag.	2010	SBP	T-Dynamics	
Kulkarni, A., Teevan, J., Svore, K. M., & Dumais, S. T. (2011). Understanding Temporal Query Dynamics. In WSDM2011: In Proceedings of the 4th ACM International Conference on Web Search and Data Mining (pp. 167 – 176). Hong Kong, China. February 9–12: ACM Press.	2011	WSDM	T-Dynamics	
Campos, R., Dias, G., & Jorge, A. M. (2011). What is the Temporal Value of Web Snippets? In TWAW 2011: Proceedings of the 1st International Temporal Web Analytics Workshop associated to WWW2011: 20th International World Wide Web Conference. Hyderabad, India. March 28.: CEUR Workshop Proceedings.	2011	WWW - TWAW	T-Dynamics	
Campos, R., Jorge, A., & Dias, G. (2011). Using Web Snippets and Query-logs to Measure Implicit Temporal Intents in Queries. In QRU 2011: Proceedings of the Query Representation and Understanding Workshop associated to SIGIR2011: 34th Annual International ACM SIGIR 2011 Conference on Research and Development in Information Retrieval, (pp. 13 – 16). Beijing, China. July 28.	2011	SIGIR - QRU	T-Dynamics	
Shokouhi, M. (2011). Detecting Seasonal Queries by Time-Series Analysis. In SIGIR2011: In Proceedings of the 34th international ACM SIGIR conference on Research and development in Information (pp. 1171 – 1172). Beijing, China. July 24–28: ACM Press.	2011	SIGIR	T-Dynamics	
Dias, G., Campos, R., & Jorge, A. (2011). Future Retrieval: What Does the Future Talk About? In ENIR 2011: Proceedings of the Enriching Information Retrieval Workshop associated to SIGIR2011: 34th Annual International ACM SIGIR Conference on Research and Development in Information Retrieval. Beijing, China. July 28.	2011	SIGIR - ENIR	F-IRetrieval	
Campos, R., Dias, G., & Jorge, A. M. (2011). An Exploratory Study on the impact of Temporal Features on the Classification and Clustering of Future-Related Web Documents. In L. Antunes, & H. S. Pinto (Eds.), Lecture Notes in Artificial Intelligence - Progress in Artificial Intelligence - EPIA2011: 15th Portuguese Conference on Artificial Intelligence associated to APPIA: Portuguese Association for Artificial Intelligence (Vol. 7026/2011, pp. 581 – 596). Lisboa, Portugal. October 10–13: Springer Berlin / Heidelberg.	2011	EPIA	F-IRetrieval	
Jatowt, A., & Yeung, C. M. (2011). Extracting Collective Expectations about the Future from Large Text Collections. In Proceedings of the CIKM2011: 20th ACM Conference on Information and Knowledge Management (pp. 1259 – 1264). Glasgow, Scotland, UK. October 24–28: ACM Press.	2011	CIKM	F-IRetrieval	
Yeung, C.-m. A., & Jatowt, A. (2011). Studying How the Past is Remembered: Towards Computational History through Large Scale Text Mining. In Proceedings of the CIKM2011: 20th ACM Conference on Information and Knowledge Management (pp. 1231 – 1240). Glasgow, Scotland, UK. October 24–28: ACM Press.	2011	CIKM	C-Memory	
Costa, M., & Silva, M. J., & Couto, F. M. (2014). Learning Temporal-Dependent Ranking Models. In Proceedings of the SIGIR2014: 37th Annual ACM SIGIR Conference (pp. 757–766). Gold Coast, Australia. July 6–11: ACM Press.	2014	SIGIR	T-RModels	

== Temporal markup languages (T-MLanguages) ==
Reference	Year	Conference/Journal	Main Scope	Comments
Setzer, A., & Gaizauskas, R. (2000). Annotating Events and Temporal Information in Newswire Texts. In LREC2000: Proceedings of the 2nd International Conference on Language Resources and Evaluation. Athens, Greece. May 31 - June 2: ELDA.	2000	LREC	T-MLanguages	
Setzer, A. (2001). Temporal Information in Newswire Articles: An Annotation Scheme and Corpus Study. Sheffield, UK: University of Sheffield.	2001	Phd Thesis	T-MLanguages	
Ferro, L., Mani, I., Sundheim, B., & Wilson, G. (2001). TIDES Temporal Annotation Guidelines. Version 1.0.2. Technical Report, MITRE Corporation, McLean, Virginia, United States.	2001	Technical Report	T-MLanguages	
Pustejovsky, J., Castaño, J., Ingria, R., Sauri, R., Gaizauskas, R., Setzer, A., et al. (2003). TimeML: Robust Specification of Event and Temporal Expression in Text. In IWCS2003: Proceedings of the 5th International Workshop on Computational Semantics, (pp. 28 – 34). Tilburg, Netherlands. January 15–17.	2003	IWCS	T-MLanguages	
Ferro, L., Gerber, L., Mani, I., Sundheim, B., & Wilson, G. (2005). TIDES 2005 Standard for the Annotation of Temporal Expressions. Technical Report, MITRE Corporation, McLean, Virginia, United States.	2005	Technical Report	T-MLanguages	

== Temporal taggers (T-taggers) ==
Reference	Year	Conference/Journal	Main Scope	Comments
TempEx Module - Tarsqi Toolkit - Mani, I., & Wilson, G. (2000). Robust Temporal Processing of News. In ACL2000: Proceedings of the 38th Annual Meeting of the Association for Computational Linguistics (pp. 69 – 76). Hong Kong, China. October 1–8: Association for Computational Linguistics.	2000	ACL	T-Taggers	
Annie - GATE distribution - Cunningham, H., Maynard, D., Bontcheva, K., & Tablan, V. (2002). GATE: A Framework And Graphical Development Environment For Robust NLP Tools And Applications. In ACL2002: Proceedings of the 40th Annual Meeting of the Association for Computational Linguistics (pp. 168 – 175). Philadelphia, PA, United States. July 6–12: Association for Computational Linguistics.	2002	ACL	T-Taggers	
GUTime - Tarsqi Toolkit	2002		T-Taggers	
HeidelTime - Strötgen, J., & Gertz, M. (2010). HeidelTime: High Quality Rule-based Extraction and Normalization of Temporal Expressions. In SemEval2010: Proceedings of the 5th International Workshop on Semantic Evaluation associated to ACL2010: 41st Annual Meeting of the Association for Computational Linguistics, (pp. 321 – 324). Uppsala, Sweden. July 11–16.	2010	ACL - SemEval	T-Taggers	
TIMEN Llorens, H., Derczynski, L., Gaizauskas, R. & Saquete, E. (2012). TIMEN: An Open Temporal Expression Normalisation Resource. In LREC2012: Proceedings of the 8th International Conference on Language Resources and Evaluation. Istanbul, Turkey. May 23–25.	2012	LREC	T-Taggers	
Chang, A., & Manning, C. (2012). SUTIME: A Library for Recognizing and Normalizing Time Expressions. In LREC2012: Proceedings of the 8th International Conference on Language Resources and Evaluation. Istanbul, Turkey. May 23–25.	2012	LREC	T-Taggers	
HeidelTime - Strötgen, J., & Gertz, M. (2012). Multilingual and cross-domain temporal tagging. In LRE: Language Resources and Evaluation, 1 - 30.	2012	LRE	T-Taggers	
ManTIME - Filannino, M., Brown, G. & Nenadic G. (2013). ManTIME: Temporal expression identification and normalization in the TempEval-3 challenge. In Second Joint Conference on Lexical and Computational Semantics (*SEM), Volume 2: Seventh International Workshop on Semantic Evaluation (SemEval 2013), 53 - 57, Atlanta, Georgia, June 14–15, 2013.	2013	ACL - SemEval	T-Taggers	online demo

== Temporal indexing (T-indexing) ==
Reference	Year	Conference/Journal	Main Scope	Comments
Alonso, O., & Gertz, M. (2006). Clustering of Search Results using Temporal Attributes. In SIGIR 2006: Proceedings of the 29th Annual International ACM SIGIR Conference on Research and Development in Information Retrieval (pp. 597 – 598). Seattle, Washington, United States. August 6–11: ACM Press.	2006	SIGIR	T-Clustering	
Berberich, K., Bedathur, S., Neumann, T., & Weikum, G. (2007). A Time Machine for Text Search. In SIGIR 2007: Proceedings of the 30th Annual International ACM SIGIR Conference on Research and Development in Information Retrieval (pp. 519 – 526). Amsterdam, Netherlands. July 23–27: ACM Press.	2007	SIGIR	W-Archives	
Jin, P., Lian, J., Zhao, X., & Wan, S. (2008). TISE: A Temporal Search Engine for Web Contents. In IITA2008: Proceedings of the 2nd International Symposium on Intelligent Information Technology Application (pp. 220 – 224). Shanghai, China. December 21–22: IEEE Computer Society Press.	2008	IITA	T-SEngine	
Song, S., & JaJa, J. (2008). Archiving Temporal Web Information: Organization of Web Contents for Fast Access and Compact Storage. Technical Report UMIACS-TR-2008-08, University of Maryland Institute for Advanced Computer Studies, Maryland, MD, United States.	2008	Technical Report	W-Archives	
Pasca, M. (2008). Towards Temporal Web Search. In SAC2008: Proceedings of the 23rd ACM Symposium on Applied Computing (pp. 1117 – 1121). Fortaleza, Ceara, Brazil. March 16–20: ACM Press.	2008	SAC	T-QAnswering	
Alonso, O., Gertz, M., & Baeza-Yates, R. (2009). Clustering and Exploring Search Results using Timeline Constructions. In CIKM 2009: Proceedings of the 18th International ACM Conference on Information and Knowledge Management. Hong Kong, China. November 2–6: ACM Press.	2009	CIKM	T-Clustering	
Arikan, I., Bedathur, S., & Berberich, K. (2009). Time Will Tell: Leveraging Temporal Expressions in IR. In WSDM 2009: Proceedings of the 2nd ACM International Conference on Web Search and Data Mining. Barcelona, Spain. February 9–12: ACM Press.	2009	WSDM	T-RModels	
Matthews, M., Tolchinsky, P., Blanco, R., Atserias, J., Mika, P., & Zaragoza, H. (2010). Searching through time in the New York Times. In HCIR2010: Proceedings of the 4th Workshop on Human-Computer Interaction and Information Retrieval, (pp. 41 – 44). New Brunswick, United States. August 22.	2010	HCIR	T-SEngine	
Anand, A., Bedathur, S., Berberich, K., & Schenkel, R. (2010). Efficient temporal keyword search over versioned text. In CIKM2010: Proceedings of the 19th ACM international conference on Information and knowledge management, (pp. 699–708). Toronto, Canada. October 26–30. ACM Press.	2010	CIKM	W-Archives	
Anand, A., Bedathur, S., Berberich, K., & Schenkel, R. (2011). Temporal index sharding for space-time efficiency in archive search. In SIGIR2011: Proceedings of the 34th Annual International ACM SIGIR Conference on Research and Development in Information Retrieval, (pp. 545–554). Beijing, China. July 24–28. ACM Press.	2011	SIGIR	T-Indexing	
Anand, A., Bedathur, S., Berberich, K., & Schenkel, R. (2012). Index Maintenance for Time-Travel Text Search. In SIGIR2012: Proceedings of the 35th Annual International ACM SIGIR Conference on Research and Development in Information Retrieval, (pp. 235 – 243). Portland, United States. August 12–16. ACM Press.	2012	SIGIR	W-Archives	

== Temporal query understanding (TQ-understanding) ==
Reference	Year	Conference/Journal	Main Scope	Comments
Vlachos, M., Meek, C., Vagena, Z., & Gunopulos, D. (2004). Identifying Similarities, Periodicities and Bursts for Online Search Queries. In SIGMOD2004: Proceedings of the International Conference on Management of Data (pp. 131 – 142). Paris, France. June 13–18: ACM Press.	2004	SIGMOD	T-Dynamics	
Beitzel, S. M., Jensen, E. C., Chowdhury, A., Frieder, O., & Grossman, D. (2007). Temporal analysis of a very large topically categorized Web query log. In JASIST: Journal of the American Society for Information Science and Technology, 58(2), 166 - 178.	2007	JASIST	T-Dynamics	
Jones, R., & Diaz, F. (2007). Temporal Profiles of Queries. In TOIS: ACM Transactions on Information Systems, 25(3). Article No.: 14.	2007	TOIS	TQ-Understanding	
Dakka, W., Gravano, L., & Ipeirotis, P. G. (2008). Answering General Time Sensitive Queries. In CIKM 2008: Proceedings of the 17th International ACM Conference on Information and Knowledge Management (pp. 1437 – 1438). Napa Valley, California, United States. October 26–30: ACM Press.	2008	CIKM	TQ-Understanding	
Diaz, F. (2009). Integration of News Content into Web Results. In WSDM2009: Proceedings of the 2nd ACM International Conference on Web Search and Data Mining (pp. 182 – 191). Barcelona, Spain. February 9–12: ACM Press.	2009	WSDM	TQ-Understanding	
Metzler, D., Jones, R., Peng, F., & Zhang, R. (2009). Improving Search Relevance for Implicitly Temporal Queries. In SIGIR2009: Proceedings of the 32nd Annual International ACM SIGIR Conference on Research and Development in Information Retrieval (pp. 700 – 701). Boston, MA, United States. July 19–23: ACM Press.	2009	SIGIR	TQ-Understanding	
König, A. (2009). Click-Through Prediction for News Queries. In SIGIR2009: Proceedings of the 32nd Annual International ACM SIGIR Conference on Research and Development in Information Retrieval (pp. 347 – 354). Boston, MA, United States. July 19–23: ACM Press.	2009	SIGIR	TQ-Understanding	
Kawai, H., Jatowt, A., Tanaka, K., Kunieda, K., & Yamada, K. (2010). ChronoSeeker: Search Engine for Future and Past Events. In ICUIMC 2010: Proceedings of the 4th International Conference on Uniquitous Information Management and Communication (pp. 166 – 175). Suwon, Republic of Korea. January 14–15: ACM Press.	2010	ICIUMC	T-SEngine	
Dong, A., Chang, Y., Zheng, Z., Mishne, G., Bai, J., Zhang, R., et al. (2010). Towards Recency Ranking in Web Search. In WSDM2010: In Proceedings of the 3rd ACM International Conference on Web Search and Data Mining (pp. 11 – 20). New York, United States. February 3–6: ACM Press.	2010	WSDM	T-RModels	
Kanhabua, N., & Nørvåg, K. (2010). Determining Time of Queries for Re-Ranking Search Results. In ECDL2010: Proceedings of the European Conference on Research and Advanced Technology for Digital Libraries. Glasgow, Scotland. September 6–10: Springer Berlin / Heidelberg.	2010	ECDL	TQ-Understanding	
Zhang, R., Konda, Y., Dong, A., Kolari, P., Chang, Y., & Zheng, Z. (2010). Learning Recurrent Event Queries for Web Search. In EMNLP2010: Proceedings of the Conference on Empiral Methods in Natural Language Processing (pp. 1129 – 1139). Massachusetts, United States. October 9–11: Association for Computational Linguistics.	2010	EMNLP	TQ-Understanding	
Kulkarni, A., Teevan, J., Svore, K. M., & Dumais, S. T. (2011). Understanding Temporal Query Dynamics. In WSDM2011: In Proceedings of the 4th ACM International Conference on Web Search and Data Mining (pp. 167 – 176). Hong Kong, China. February 9–12: ACM Press.	2011	WSDM	T-Dynamics	
Campos, R. (2011). Using k-top Retrieved Web Snippets to Date Temporal Implicit Queries based on Web Content Analysis. In SIGIR 2011: Proceedings of the 34th Annual International ACM SIGIR Conference on Research and Development in Information Retrieval (p. 1325). Beijing, China. July 24–28.: ACM Press.	2011	SIGIR	TQ-Understanding	
Campos, R., Jorge, A., & Dias, G. (2011). Using Web Snippets and Query-logs to Measure Implicit Temporal Intents in Queries. In QRU 2011: Proceedings of the Query Representation and Understanding Workshop associated to SIGIR2011: 34th Annual International ACM SIGIR 2005 Conference on Research and Development in Information Retrieval, (pp. 13 – 16). Beijing, China. July 28.	2011	SIGIR - QRU	T-Dynamics	
Shokouhi, M. (2011). Detecting Seasonal Queries by Time-Series Analysis. In SIGIR 2011: Proceedings of the 34th Annual International ACM SIGIR Conference on Research and Development in Information Retrieval (pp. 1171 – 1172). Beijing, China. July 24–28.: ACM Press.	2011	SIGIR	TQ-Understanding	
Campos, R., Dias, G., Jorge, A., & Nunes, C. (2012). Enriching Temporal Query Understanding through Date Identification: How to Tag Implicit Temporal Queries? In TWAW 2012: Proceedings of the 2nd International Temporal Web Analytics Workshop associated to WWW2012: 20th International World Wide Web Conference (pp. 41 – 48). Lyon, France. April 17.: ACM - DL.	2012	WWW - TWAW	TQ-Understanding	
Shokouhi, M., & Radinsky, K. (2012). Time-Sensitive Query Auto-Completion. In SIGIR 2012: Proceedings of the 35th Annual International ACM SIGIR Conference on Research and Development in Information Retrieval (pp. 601 – 610). Portland, United States. August 12–16.: ACM Press.	2012	SIGIR	TQ-Understanding	
Campos, R., Dias, G., Jorge, A., & Nunes, C. (2012). GTE: A Distributional Second-Order Co-Occurrence Approach to Improve the Identification of Top Relevant Dates In CIKM 2012: Proceedings of the 21st ACM Conference on Information and Knowledge Management (pp. 2035 – 2039). Maui, Hawaii, United States. October 29 - November 2.: ACM Press.	2012	CIKM	TQ-Understanding	
Campos, R., Jorge, A., Dias, G., & Nunes, C. (2012). Disambiguating Implicit Temporal Queries by Clustering Top Relevant Dates in Web Snippets In WIC 2012: Proceedings of the 2012 IEEE/WIC/ACM International Joint Conferences on Web Intelligence and Intelligent Agent Technology, Vol. 1, (pp. 1 – 8). Macau, China. December 4–07.	2012	WIC	T-Clustering	

== Time-aware retrieval/ranking models (T-RModels) ==
Reference	Year	Conference/Journal	Main Scope	Comments
Li, X., & Croft, B. W. (2003). Time-Based Language Models. In CIKM 2003: Proceedings of the 12th International ACM Conference on Information and Knowledge Management (pp. 469 – 475). New Orleans, Louisiana, United States. November 2–8: ACM Press.	2003	CIKM	T-RModels	
Sato, N., Uehara, M., & Sakai, Y. (2003). Temporal Information Retrieval in Cooperative Search Engine. In DEXA2003: Proceedings of the 14th International Workshop on Database and Expert Systems Applications (pp. 215 – 220). Prague, Czech Republic. September 1–5: IEEE.	2003	DEXA	T-RModels	
Berberich, K., Vazirgiannis, M., & Weikum, G. (2005). Time-Aware Authority Ranking. In IM: Internet Mathematics, 2(3), 301 - 332.	2005	IM	T-RModels	
Cho, J., Roy, S., & Adams, R. (2005). Page Quality: In Search of an Unbiased Web Ranking. In SIGMOD2005: Proceedings of the International Conference on Management of Data (pp. 551 – 562). Baltimore, United States. June 13–16: ACM Press.	2005	SIGMOD	T-RModels	
Perkiö, J., Buntine, W., & Tirri, H. (2005). A Temporally Adaptative Content-Based Relevance Ranking Algorithm. In SIGIR 2005: Proceedings of the 28th Annual International ACM SIGIR Conference on Research and Development in Information Retrieval (pp. 647 – 648). Salvador, Brazil. August 15–16: ACM Press.	2005	SIGIR	T-RModels	
Jones, R., & Diaz, F. (2007). Temporal Profiles of Queries. In TOIS: ACM Transactions on Information Systems, 25(3). Article No.: 14.	2007	TOIS	TQ-Understanding	
Pasca, M. (2008). Towards Temporal Web Search. In SAC2008: Proceedings of the 23rd ACM Symposium on Applied Computing (pp. 1117 – 1121). Fortaleza, Ceara, Brazil. March 16–20: ACM Press.	2008	SAC	T-QAnswering	
Dakka, W., Gravano, L., & Ipeirotis, P. G. (2008). Answering General Time Sensitive Queries. In CIKM 2008: Proceedings of the 17th International ACM Conference on Information and Knowledge Management (pp. 1437 – 1438). Napa Valley, California, United States. October 26–30: ACM Press.	2008	CIKM	TQ-Understanding	
Jin, P., Lian, J., Zhao, X., & Wan, S. (2008). TISE: A Temporal Search Engine for Web Contents. In IITA2008: Proceedings of the 2nd International Symposium on Intelligent Information Technology Application (pp. 220 – 224). Shanghai, China. December 21–22: IEEE Computer Society Press.	2008	IITA	T-SEngine	
Arikan, I., Bedathur, S., & Berberich, K. (2009). Time Will Tell: Leveraging Temporal Expressions in IR. In WSDM 2009: Proceedings of the 2nd ACM International Conference on Web Search and Data Mining. Barcelona, Spain. February 9–12: ACM Press.	2009	WSDM	T-RModels	
Zhang, R., Chang, Y., Zheng, Z., Metzler, D., & Nie, J.-y. (2009). Search Result Re-ranking by Feedback Control Adjustment for Time-sensitive Query. In NAACL2009: Proceedings of the North American Chapter of the Association for Computational Linguistics - Human Language Technologies, (pp. 165 – 168). Boulder, Colorado, United States. May 31 - June 5.	2009	NAACL	T-RModels	
Metzler, D., Jones, R., Peng, F., & Zhang, R. (2009). Improving Search Relevance for Implicitly Temporal Queries. In SIGIR 2009: Proceedings of the 32nd Annual International ACM SIGIR Conference on Research and Development in Information Retrieval (pp. 700 – 701). Boston, MA, United States. July 19–23: ACM Press.	2009	SIGIR	TQ-Understanding	
Alonso, O., Gertz, M., & Baeza-Yates, R. (2009). Clustering and Exploring Search Results using Timeline Constructions. In CIKM 2009: Proceedings of the 18th International ACM Conference on Information and Knowledge Management. Hong Kong, China. November 2–6: ACM Press.	2009	CIKM	T-Clustering	
Kawai, H., Jatowt, A., Tanaka, K., Kunieda, K., & Yamada, K. (2010). ChronoSeeker: Search Engine for Future and Past Events. In ICUIMC 2010: Proceedings of the 4th International Conference on Uniquitous Information Management and Communication (pp. 166 – 175). Suwon, Republic of Korea. January 14–15: ACM Press.	2010	ICIUMC	T-SEngine	
Elsas, J. L., & Dumais, S. T. (2010). Leveraging Temporal Dynamics of Document Content in Relevance Ranking. In WSDM10: Third ACM International Conference on Web Search and Data Mining (pp. 1 – 10). New York, United States. February 3–06: ACM Press.	2010	WSDM	T-Dynamics	
Aji, A., Wang, Y., Agichtein, E., Gabrilovich, E. (2010). Using the Past to Score the Present: Extending Term Weighting Models Through Revision History Analysis In CIKM 2010: Proceedings of the 19th ACM Conference on Information and Knowledge Management (pp. 629 – 638). Toronto, ON, Canada. October 26 - October 30: ACM Press.	2010	CIKM	T-RModels	
Dong, A., Chang, Y., Zheng, Z., Mishne, G., Bai, J., Zhang, R., et al. (2010). Towards Recency Ranking in Web Search. In WSDM2010: In Proceedings of the 3rd ACM International Conference on Web Search and Data Mining (pp. 11 – 20). New York, United States. February 3–6: ACM Press.	2010	WSDM	T-RModels	
Berberich, K., Bedathur, S., Alonso, O., & Weikum, G. (2010). A Language Modeling Approach for Temporal Information Needs. In C. Gurrin, Y. He, G. Kazai, U. Kruschwitz, S. Little, T. Roelleke, et al. (Eds.), In Lecture Notes in Computer Science - Research and Advanced Technology for Digital Libraries, ECIR 2010: 32nd European Conference on Information Retrieval (Vol. 5993/2010, pp. 13 – 25). Milton Keynes, UK. March 28–31: Springer Berlin / Heidelberg.	2010	ECIR	T-RModels	
Dong, A., Zhang, R., Kolari, P., Jing, B., Diaz, F., Chang, Y., Zheng, Z., & Zha, H. (2010). Time is of the Essence: Improving Recency Ranking Using Twitter Data. In WWW2010: Proceedings of the 19th International World Wide Web Conference (pp. 331 – 340). Raleigh, United States. April 26–30: ACM Press.	2010	WWW	T-RModels	
Inagaki, Y., Sadagopan, N., Dupret, G., Dong, A., Liao, C., Chang, Y., & Zheng, Z. (2010). Session Based Click Features for Recency Ranking. In AAAI2010: Proceedings of the 24th AAAI Conference on Artificial Intelligence (pp. 331 – 340). Atlanta, United States. June 11–15: AAAI Press.	2010	AAAI	T-RModels	
Dai, N., & Davison, B. (2010). Freshness Matters: In Flowers, Food, and Web Authority. In SIGIR 2010: Proceedings of the 33rd Annual International ACM SIGIR Conference on Research and Development in Information Retrieval (pp. 114 – 121). Geneve, Switzerland. July 19–23: ACM Press.	2010	SIGIR	T-RModels	
Matthews, M., Tolchinsky, P., Blanco, R., Atserias, J., Mika, P., & Zaragoza, H. (2010). Searching through time in the New York Times. In HCIR2010: Proceedings of the 4th Workshop on Human-Computer Interaction and Information Retrieval, (pp. 41 – 44). New Brunswick, United States. August 22.	2010	HCIR	T-SEngine	
Kanhabua, N., & Nørvåg, K. (2010). Determining Time of Queries for Re-Ranking Search Results. In ECDL2010: Proceedings of the European Conference on Research and Advanced Technology for Digital Libraries. Glasgow, Scotland. September 6–10: Springer Berlin / Heidelberg.	2010	ECDL	TQ-Understanding	
Efron, M., & Golovchinsky, G. (2011). Estimation Methods for Ranking Recent Information. In SIGIR 2011: Proceedings of the 34th Annual International ACM SIGIR Conference on Research and Development in Information Retrieval (pp. 495 – 504). Beijing, China. July 24–28.: ACM Press.	2011	SIGIR	T-RModels	
Dai, N., Shokouhi, M., & Davison, B. D. (2011). Learning to Rank for Freshness and Relevance. In SIGIR 2011: Proceedings of the 34th Annual International ACM SIGIR Conference on Research and Development in Information Retrieval (pp. 95 – 104). Beijing, China. July 24–28.: ACM Press.	2011	SIGIR	T-RModels	
Kanhabua, N., Blanco, R., & Matthews, M. (2011). Ranking Related News Predictions. In SIGIR 2011: Proceedings of the 34th Annual International ACM SIGIR Conference on Research and Development in Information Retrieval (pp. 755 – 764). Beijing, China. July 24–28: ACM Press.	2011	SIGIR	F-IRetrieval	
Chang, P-T., Huang, Y-C., Yang, C-L., Lin, S-D., & Cheng, P-J. (2012). Learning-Based Time-Sensitive Re-Ranking for Web Search. In Proceedings of the SIGIR2012: 35th Annual International ACM SIGIR 2012 Conference on Research and Development in Information Retrieval, (pp. 1101 – 1102). Portland, United States. August 12–16.	2012	SIGIR	T-RModels	
Efron, M. (2012). Query-Specific Recency Ranking: Survival Analysis for Improved Microblog Retrieval. In TAIA 2012: Proceedings of the Time-Aware Information Access Workshop associated to SIGIR2012: 35th Annual International ACM SIGIR 2012 Conference on Research and Development in Information Retrieval. Portland, United States. August 16.	2012	SIGIR - TAIA	T-RModels	
Kanhabua, N., & Nørvåg, K. (2012). Learning to Rank Search Results for Time-Sensitive Queries In CIKM 2012: Proceedings of the 21st ACM Conference on Information and Knowledge Management (pp. 2463 – 2466). Maui, Hawaii, United States. October 29 - November 2.: ACM Press.	2012	CIKM	T-RModels	
Kim G., and Xing E. P. (2013). Time-Sensitive Web Image Ranking and Retrieval via Dynamic Multi-Task Regression. In WSDM2013: Proceedings of the 6th ACM International Conference on Web Search and Data Mining (pp. 163 – 172). Rome, Italy. February 4–8: ACM Press.	2013	WSDM	T-IRetrieval	
Costa, M., & Silva, M. J., & Couto, F. M. (2014). Learning Temporal-Dependent Ranking Models. In Proceedings of the SIGIR2014: 37th Annual ACM SIGIR Conference (pp. 757–766). Gold Coast, Australia. July 6–11: ACM Press.	2014	SIGIR	T-RModels	

== Temporal clustering (T-clustering) ==
Reference	Year	Conference/Journal	Main Scope	Comments
Shaparenko, B., Caruana, R., Gehrke, J., & Joachims, T. (2005). Identifying Temporal Patterns and Key Players in Document Collections. In TDM2005: Proceedings of the Workshop on Temporal Data Mining associated to ICDM2005 (pp. 165 – 174). Houston, United States. November 27–30: IEEE Press.	2005	ICDM - TDM	TDT	
Alonso, O., & Gertz, M. (2006). Clustering of Search Results using Temporal Attributes. In SIGIR 2006: Proceedings of the 29th Annual International ACM SIGIR Conference on Research and Development in Information Retrieval (pp. 597 – 598). Seattle, Washington, United States. August 6–11: ACM Press.	2006	SIGIR	T-Clustering	
Mori, M., Miura, T., & Shioya, I. (2006). Topic Detection and Tracking for News Web Pages. In WIC2006: IEEE Main Conference Proceedings of the IEEE/WIC/ACM International Conference on Web Intelligence (pp. 338 – 342). Hong Kong, China. December 18–22: IEEE Computer Society Press.	2006	WIC	TDT	
Alonso, O., Baeza-Yates, R., & Gertz, M. (2007). Exploratory Search Using Timelines. In ESCHI: Proceedings of the Workshop on Exploratory Search and Computer Human Interaction associated to CHI2007: SIGCHI Conference on Human Factors in Computing Systems. San Jose, CA, United States. April 29: ACM Press.	2007	CHI - ESCHI	T-SEngine	
Jatowt, A., Kawai, H., Kanazawa, K., Tanaka, K., & Kunieda, K. (2009). Supporting Analysis of Future-Related Information in News Archives and the Web. In JCDL2009: Proceedings of the Joint Conference on Digital Libraries (pp. 115 – 124). Austin, United States. June 15–19.: ACM Press.	2009	JCDL	F-IRetrieval	
Campos, R., Dias, G., & Jorge, A. (2009). Disambiguating Web Search Results By Topic and Temporal Clustering: A Proposal. In KDIR2009: Proceedings of the International Conference on Knowledge Discovery and Information Retrieval, (pp. 292 – 296). Funchal - Madeira, Portugal. October 6–8.	2009	KDIR	T-Clustering	
Alonso, O., Gertz, M., & Baeza-Yates, R. (2009). Clustering and Exploring Search Results using Timeline Constructions. In CIKM 2009: Proceedings of the 18th International ACM Conference on Information and Knowledge Management. Hong Kong, China. November 2–6: ACM Press.	2009	CIKM	T-Clustering	
Kawai, H., Jatowt, A., Tanaka, K., Kunieda, K., & Yamada, K. (2010). ChronoSeeker: Search Engine for Future and Past Events. In ICUIMC 2010: Proceedings of the 4th International Conference on Uniquitous Information Management and Communication (pp. 166 – 175). Suwon, Republic of Korea. January 14–15: ACM Press.	2010	ICIUMC	T-SEngine	
Jatowt, A., & Yeung, C. M. (2011). Extracting Collective Expectations about the Future from Large Text Collections. In Proceedings of the CIKM2011: 20th ACM Conference on Information and Knowledge Management (pp. 1259 – 1264). Glasgow, Scotland, UK. October: ACM Press.	2011	CIKM	F-IRetrieval	
Campos, R., Jorge, A., Dias, G., & Nunes, C. (2012). Disambiguating Implicit Temporal Queries by Clustering Top Relevant Dates in Web Snippets In WIC 2012: Proceedings of the 2012 IEEE/WIC/ACM International Joint Conferences on Web Intelligence and Intelligent Agent Technology, Vol. 1, (pp. 1 – 8). Macau, China. December 4–07.	2012	WIC	T-Clustering	

== Temporal text classification (T-classification) ==
Reference	Year	Conference/Journal	Main Scope	Comments
Jong, F., Rode, H., & Hiemstra, D. (2006). Temporal Language Models for the Disclosure of Historical Text. In AHC2005: Proceedings of the XVIth International Conference of the Association for History and Computing (pp. 161 – 168). Amsterdam, Netherlands. September 14–17	2005	AHC	T-Classification	
Toyoda, M., & Kitsuregawa, M. (2006). What's Really New on the Web? Identifying New Pages from a Series of Unstable Web Snapshots. In WWW2006: Proceedings of the 15th International World Wide Web Conference (pp. 233 – 241). Edinburgh, Scotland. May 23–26: ACM Press.	2006	WWW	T-Classification	
Nunes, S., Ribeiro, C., & David, G. (2007). Using Neighbors to Date Web Documents. In WIDM2007: Proceedings of the 9th ACM International Workshop on Web Information and Data Management associated to CIKM2007: 16th International Conference on Knowledge and Information Management (pp. 129 – 136). Lisboa, Portugal. November 9: ACM Press.	2007	CIKM - WIDM	T-Classification	
Jatowt, A., Kawai, Y., & Tanaka, K. (2007). Detecting Age of Page Content. In WIDM2007: Proceedings of the 8th International Workshop on Web Information and Data Management associated to CIKM2007: 16th International Conference on Knowledge and Information Management (pp. 137 – 144). Lisbon. Portugal. November 9.: ACM Press.	2007	CIKM - WIDM	T-Classification	
Kanhabua, N., & Nørvåg, K. (2008). Improving Temporal Language Models for Determining Time of Non-timestamped Documents. In Christensen-Dalsgaard, B., Castelli, D., Jurik, B. A., Lippincott, J. (Eds.), In Lecture Notes in Computer Science - Research and Advanced Technology for Digital Libraries, ECDL 2008: 12th European Conference on Research and Advances Technology for Digital Libraries (Vol. 5173/2008, pp. 358 – 370). Aarhus, Denmark. September 14–19: Springer Berlin / Heidelberg.	2008	ECDL	T-Classification	
Jatowt, A., & Yeung, C. M. (2011). Extracting Collective Expectations about the Future from Large Text Collections. In Proceedings of the CIKM2011: 20th ACM Conference on Information and Knowledge Management (pp. 1259 – 1264). Glasgow, Scotland, UK. October: ACM Press.	2011	CIKM	F-IRetrieval	
Strötgen, J., Alonso, O., & Gertz, M. (2012). Identification of Top Relevant Temporal Expressions in Documents. In TWAW 2012: Proceedings of the 2nd International Temporal Web Analytics Workshop associated to WWW2012: 20th International World Wide Web Conference (pp. 33 – 40). Lyon, France. April 17: ACM - DL.	2012	WWW - TWAW	T-Classification	
Filannino, M., and Nenadic, G. (2014). Mining temporal footprints from Wikipedia. In Proceedings of the First AHA!-Workshop on Information Discovery in Text (Dublin, Ireland, August 2014), Association for Computational Linguistics and Dublin City University, pp. 7–13.	2014	COLING	T-Classification	online demo

== Temporal visualization (T-interfaces) ==
Reference	Year	Conference/Journal	Main Scope	Comments
Swan, R., & Allan, J. (2000). Automatic Generation of Overview Timelines. In SIGIR 2000: Proceedings of the 23rd Annual International ACM SIGIR Conference on Research and Development in Information Retrieval (pp. 49 – 56). Athens, Greece. July 24–28: ACM Press.	2000	SIGIR	TDT	
Swan, R., & Jensen, D. (2000). TimeMines: Constructing Timelines with Statistical Models of Word Usage. In M. Grobelnik, D. Mladenic, & N. Milic-Frayling (Ed.), TM2000: Proceedings of the Workshop on Text Mining associated to KDD2000: 6th ACM SIGKDD International Conference on Knowledge Discovery and Data Mining (pp. 73 – 80). Boston, Massachusetts, United States. August 20–23: ACM Press.	2000	KDD - TM	TDT	
Google Ngram Viewer			T-Interfaces	
Cousins, S., & Kahn, M. (1991). The Visual Display of Temporal Information. (E. Keravnou, Ed.) In AIM: Artificial Intelligence in Medicine, 3(6), 341 - 357.	1991	AIM	T-Interfaces	
Karam, G. M. (1994). Visualization Using Timelines. In T. J. Ostrand (Ed.), ISSTA1994: Proceedings of the International Symposium on Software Testing and Analysis associated to SIGSOFT: ACM Special Interest Group on Software Engineering (pp. 125 – 137). Seattle, Washington, United States. August 17–19: ACM Press.	1994	ISSTA	T-Interfaces	
Plaisant, C., Miiash, B., Rose, A., Widoff, S., & Shneiderman, B. (1996). LifeLines: Visualizing Personal Histories. In CHI1996: Proceedings of the SIGCHI Conference on Human Factors in Computing Systems (pp. 221 – 227). Vancouver, British Columbia, Canada. April 13–18: ACM Press.	1996	CHI	T-Interfaces	
Toyoda, M., & Kitsuregawa, M. (2005). A System for Visualizing and Analyzing the Evolution of the Web with a Time Series of Graphs. In HT2005: Proceedings of the 16th ACM Conference on Hypertext and Hypermedia (pp. 151 – 160). Salzburg, Austria. September 6–9: ACM Press.	2005	HT	W-Archives	
Efendioglu, D., Faschetti, C., & Parr, T. (2006). Chronica: a temporal web search engine. In D. Wolber, N. Calder, & ,. C. Brooks (Ed.), ICWE2006: Proceedings of the 6th International Conference on Web Engineering (pp. 119 – 120). Palo Alto, California, United States. July 11–14: ACM Press.	2006	ICWE	W-Archives	
Catizone, R., Dalli, A., & Wilks, Y. (2006). Evaluating Automatically Generated Timelines from the Web. In LREC2006: Proceedings of the 5th International Conference on Language Resources and Evaluation. Genoa, Italy. May 24–26: ELDA.	2006	LREC	T-Interfaces	
Mori, M., Miura, T., & Shioya, I. (2006). Topic Detection and Tracking for News Web Pages. In WIC2006: IEEE Main Conference Proceedings of the IEEE/WIC/ACM International Conference on Web Intelligence (pp. 338 – 342). Hong Kong, China. December 18–22: IEEE Computer Society Press.	2006	WIC	TDT	
Alonso, O., Baeza-Yates, R., & Gertz, M. (2007). Exploratory Search Using Timelines. In ESCHI: Proceedings of the Workshop on Exploratory Search and Computer Human Interaction associated to CHI2007: SIGCHI Conference on Human Factors in Computing Systems. San Jose, CA, United States. April 29: ACM Press.	2007	CHI - ESCHI	T-SEngine	
Jatowt, A., Kawai, Y., & Tanaka, K. (2008). Visualizing Historical Content of Web pages. In WWW2008: Proceedings of the 17th International World Wide Web Conference (pp. 1221 – 1222). Beijing, China. April 21–25: ACM Press.	2008	WWW	W-Archives	
Nunes, S., Ribeiro, C., & David, G. (2008). WikiChanges - Exposing Wikipedia Revision Activity. In WikiSym2008: Proceedings of the 4th International Symposium on Wikis. Porto, Portugal. September 8–10: ACM Press.	2008	WikiSym	T-Interfaces	
Nunes, S., Ribeiro, C., & David, G. (2009). Improving Web User Experience with Document Activity Sparklines. In L. S. Lopes, N. Lau, P. Mariano, & L. Rocha (Ed.), EPIA2009: Proceedings of the 14th Portuguese Conference on Artificial Intelligence associated to APPIA: Portuguese Association for Artificial Intelligence, (pp. 601 – 604). Aveiro, Portugal. October 12–15.	2009	EPIA	T-Interfaces	
Kawai, H., Jatowt, A., Tanaka, K., Kunieda, K., & Yamada, K. (2010). ChronoSeeker: Search Engine for Future and Past Events. In ICUIMC 2010: Proceedings of the 4th International Conference on Uniquitous Information Management and Communication (pp. 166 – 175). Suwon, Republic of Korea. January 14–15: ACM Press.	2010	ICIUMC	T-SEngine	
Matthews, M., Tolchinsky, P., Blanco, R., Atserias, J., Mika, P., & Zaragoza, H. (2010). Searching through time in the New York Times. In HCIR2010: Proceedings of the 4th Workshop on Human-Computer Interaction and Information Retrieval, (pp. 41 – 44). New Brunswick, United States. August 22.	2010	HCIR	T-SEngine	
Khurana, U., Nguyen V., Cheng H., Ahn, J., Chen X., & Shneiderman, B. (2011). Visual Analysis of Temporal Trends in Social Networks Using Edge Color Coding and Metric Timelines. In : Proceedings of the IEEE Social Computing, (pp. 549 – 554). Boston, United States.	2011	SocialCom	T-Interfaces	

== Temporal search engines (T-SEngine) ==
Reference	Year	Conference/Journal	Main Scope	Comments
Alonso, O., & Gertz, M. (2006). Clustering of Search Results using Temporal Attributes. In SIGIR 2006: Proceedings of the 29th Annual International ACM SIGIR Conference on Research and Development in Information Retrieval (pp. 597 – 598). Seattle, Washington, United States. August 6–11: ACM Press.	2006	SIGIR	T-Clustering	
Alonso, O., Baeza-Yates, R., & Gertz, M. (2007). Exploratory Search Using Timelines. In ESCHI: Proceedings of the Workshop on Exploratory Search and Computer Human Interaction associated to CHI2007: SIGCHI Conference on Human Factors in Computing Systems. San Jose, CA, United States. April 29: ACM Press.	2007	CHI - ESCHI	T-SEngine	
Jin, P., Lian, J., Zhao, X., & Wan, S. (2008). TISE: A Temporal Search Engine for Web Contents. In IITA2008: Proceedings of the 2nd International Symposium on Intelligent Information Technology Application (pp. 220 – 224). Shanghai, China. December 21–22: IEEE Computer Society Press.	2008	IITA	T-SEngine	
Alonso, O., Gertz, M., & Baeza-Yates, R. (2009). Clustering and Exploring Search Results using Timeline Constructions. In CIKM 2009: Proceedings of the 18th International ACM Conference on Information and Knowledge Management. Hong Kong, China. November 2–6: ACM Press.	2009	CIKM	T-Clustering	
Kawai, H., Jatowt, A., Tanaka, K., Kunieda, K., & Yamada, K. (2010). ChronoSeeker: Search Engine for Future and Past Events. In ICUIMC 2010: Proceedings of the 4th International Conference on Uniquitous Information Management and Communication (pp. 166 – 175). Suwon, Republic of Korea. January 14–15: ACM Press.	2010	ICIUMC	T-SEngine	
Matthews, M., Tolchinsky, P., Blanco, R., Atserias, J., Mika, P., & Zaragoza, H. (2010). Searching through time in the New York Times. In HCIR2010: Proceedings of the 4th Workshop on Human-Computer Interaction and Information Retrieval, (pp. 41 – 44). New Brunswick, United States. August 22.	2010	HCIR	T-SEngine	

== Temporal question answering (T-QAnswering) ==
Reference	Year	Conference/Journal	Main Scope	Comments
Pasca, M. (2008). Towards Temporal Web Search. In SAC2008: Proceedings of the 23rd ACM Symposium on Applied Computing (pp. 1117 – 1121). Fortaleza, Ceara, Brazil. March 16–20: ACM Press.	2008	SAC	T-QAnswering	

== Temporal snippets (T-snippets) ==
Reference	Year	Conference/Journal	Main Scope	Comments
Alonso, O., Baeza-Yates, R., & Gertz, M. (2009). Effectiveness of Temporal Snippets. In WSSP2009: Proceedings of the Workshop on Web Search Result Summarization and Presentation associated to WWW2009: 18th International World Wide Web Conference. Madrid, Spain. April 20–24: ACM Press.	2009	WWW - WSSP	T-Snippets	
Alonso, O., Gertz, M., & Baeza-Yates, R. (2011). Enhancing Document Snippets Using Temporal Information. In R. Grossi, F. Sebastiani, & F. Silvestri (Eds.), Lecture Notes in Computer Science, SPIRE2011: 18th International Symposium on String Processing and Information Retrieval (Vol. 7024, pp. 26 – 31). Pisa, Italy. October 17–21.: Springer Berlin / Heidelberg.	2011	SPIRE	T-Snippets	
Svore, K. M., Teevan, J., Dumais, S. T., & Kulkarni, A. (2012). Creating Temporally Dynamic Web Search Snippets. In SIGIR2012: Proceedings of the 35th Annual International ACM SIGIR Conference on Research and Development in Information Retrieval, (pp. 1045 – 1046). Portland, United States. August 12–16. ACM Press	2012	SIGIR	T-Snippets	

== Future information retrieval (F-IRetrieval) ==
Reference	Year	Conference/Journal	Main Scope	Comments
Baeza-Yates, R. (2005). Searching the Future. In S. Dominich, I. Ounis, & J.-Y. Nie (Ed.), MFIR2005: Proceedings of the Mathematical/Formal Methods in Information Retrieval Workshop associated to SIGIR 2005: 28th Annual International ACM SIGIR Conference on Research and Development in Information Retrieval. Salvador, Brazil. August 15–19: ACM Press.	2005	SIGIR - MFIR	F-IRetrieval	
Jatowt, A., Kawai, H., Kanazawa, K., Tanaka, K., & Kunieda, K. (2009). Supporting Analysis of Future-Related Information in News Archives and the Web. In JCDL2009: Proceedings of the Joint Conference on Digital Libraries (pp. 115 – 124). Austin, United States. June 15–19.: ACM Press.	2009	JCDL	F-IRetrieval	
Kawai, H., Jatowt, A., Tanaka, K., Kunieda, K., & Yamada, K. (2010). ChronoSeeker: Search Engine for Future and Past Events. In ICUIMC 2010: Proceedings of the 4th International Conference on Uniquitous Information Management and Communication (pp. 166 – 175). Suwon, Republic of Korea. January 14–15: ACM Press.	2010	ICIUMC	T-SEngine	
Jatowt, A., Kawai, H., Kanazawa, K., Tanaka, K., & Kunieda, K. (2010). Analyzing Collective View of Future, Time-referenced Events on the Web. In WWW2010: Proceedings of the 19th International World Wide Web Conference (pp. 1123 – 1124). Raleigh, United States. April 26–30: ACM Press.	2010	WWW	F-IRetrieval	
Matthews, M., Tolchinsky, P., Blanco, R., Atserias, J., Mika, P., & Zaragoza, H. (2010). Searching through time in the New York Times. In HCIR2010: Proceedings of the 4th Workshop on Human-Computer Interaction and Information Retrieval, (pp. 41 – 44). New Brunswick, United States. August 22.	2010	HCIR	T-SEngine	
Dias, G., Campos, R., & Jorge, A. (2011). Future Retrieval: What Does the Future Talk About? In ENIR 2011: Proceedings of the Enriching Information Retrieval Workshop associated to SIGIR2011: 34th Annual International ACM SIGIR Conference on Research and Development in Information Retrieval. Beijing, China. July 28.	2011	SIGIR - ENIR	F-IRetrieval	
Kanhabua, N., Blanco, R., & Matthews, M. (2011). Ranking Related News Predictions. In SIGIR 2011: Proceedings of the 34th Annual International ACM SIGIR Conference on Research and Development in Information Retrieval (pp. 755 – 764). Beijing, China. July 24–28: ACM Press.	2011	SIGIR	F-IRetrieval	
Kanazawa, K., Jatowt, A., & Tanaka, K. (2011). Improving Retrieval of Future-Related Information in Text Collections. In 2011/ WIC2011: IEEE Main Conference Proceedings of the IEEE/WIC/ACM International Conference on Web Intelligence (pp. 278 – 283). Lyon, France. August 22–27: IEEE Computer Society Press.	2011	WIC	F-IRetrieval	
Campos, R., Dias, G., & Jorge, A. M. (2011). An Exploratory Study on the impact of Temporal Features on the Classification and Clustering of Future-Related Web Documents. In L. Antunes, & H. S. Pinto (Eds.), Lecture Notes in Artificial Intelligence - Progress in Artificial Intelligence - EPIA2011: 15th Portuguese Conference on Artificial Intelligence associated to APPIA: Portuguese Association for Artificial Intelligence (Vol. 7026/2011, pp. 581 – 596). Lisboa, Portugal. October 10–13: Springer Berlin / Heidelberg.	2011	EPIA	F-IRetrieval	
Jatowt, A., & Yeung, C. M. (2011). Extracting Collective Expectations about the Future from Large Text Collections. In Proceedings of the CIKM2011: 20th ACM Conference on Information and Knowledge Management (pp. 1259 – 1264). Glasgow, Scotland, UK. October: ACM Press.	2011	CIKM	F-IRetrieval	
Weerkamp, W., & Rijke, M. (2012). Activity Prediction: A Twitter-based Exploration. In TAIA 2012: Proceedings of the Time-Aware Information Access Workshop associated to SIGIR2012: 35th Annual International ACM SIGIR 2012 Conference on Research and Development in Information Retrieval. Portland, United States. August 16.	2012	SIGIR - TAIA	F-IRetrieval	
Radinski, K., & Horvitz, E. (2013). Mining the Web to Predict Future Events. In WSDM2013: Proceedings of the 6th ACM International Conference on Web Search and Data Mining (pp. 255 – 264). Rome, Italy. February 4–8: ACM Press.	2013	WSDM	F-IRetrieval	

== Temporal image retrieval (T-IRetrieval) ==
Reference	Year	Conference/Journal	Main Scope	Comments
Dias, G., Moreno, J. G., Jatowt, A., & Campos, R. (2012). Temporal Web Image Retrieval. In Calderón-Benavides, L., González-Caro, C., Chávez, E., Ziviani, N. (Eds.), In Lecture Notes in Computer Science - SPIRE2012: 19th International Symposium on String Processing and Information Retrieval (Vol. 7608/2012, pp. 199 – 204). Cartagena de Indias, Colombia. October 21–25: Springer Berlin / Heidelberg.	2012	SPIRE	T-IRetrieval	
Palermo, F., Hays, J., & Efros, A. (2012). Dating Historical Color Images. In Fitzgibbon, A., Lazebnik, S., Sato, Y., Schmid, C. (Eds.), In Lecture Notes in Computer Science - ECCV2012: 12th European Conference on Computer Vision (Vol. 7577/2012, pp. 499 – 512). Firenze, Italy. October 7–13: Springer Berlin / Heidelberg.	2012	ECCV	T-IRetrieval	
Kim, G., & Xing, E. P. (2013). Time-Sensitive Web Image Ranking and Retrieval via Dynamic Multi-Task Regression. In WSDM2013: Proceedings of the 6th ACM International Conference on Web Search and Data Mining (pp. 163 – 172). Rome, Italy. February 4–8: ACM Press.	2013	WSDM	T-IRetrieval	
Martin, P., Doucet, A., & Jurie, F. (2014). Dating Color Images with Ordinal Classification. In ICMR2014: Proceedings of International Conference on Multimedia Retrieval (pp. 447). Glasgow, United Kingdom. April 1–04: ACM Press.	2014	ICMR	T-IRetrieval	

== Collective memory (C-memory) ==
Reference	Year	Conference/Journal	Main Scope	Comments
Surowiecki, J. (2004). The Wisdom of Crowds: Why the Many Are Smarter Than the Few and How Collective Wisdom Shapes Business, Economies, Societies and Nations. USA: DoubleDay.	2004		C-Memory	
Hall, D., Jurafsky, D., & Manning, C. D. (2008). Studying the History of Ideas using Topic Models. In EMNLP 2008: Proceedings of the Conference on Empirical Methods in Natural Language Processing (pp. 363 – 371). Waikiki, Honolulu, Hawaii. October 25–27: Association for Computational Linguistics.	2008	EMNLP	C-Memory	
Shahaf, D., & Guestrin, C. (2010). Connecting the dots between News Articles. In KDD2010: Proceedings of the 16th ACM SIGKDD International Conference on Knowledge Discovery and Data Mining (pp. 623 – 632). Washington, United States. July 25–28: ACM Press.	2010	KDD	C-Memory	
Takahashi, Y., Ohshima, H., Yamamoto, M., Iwasaki, H., Oyama, S., & Tanaka, K. (2011). Evaluating Significance of Historical Entities based on Tempo-spatial Impacts Analysis using Wikipedia Link Structure. In HT2011: Proceedings of the 22nd ACM Conference on Hypertext and Hypermedia (pp. 83 – 92). Eindhoven, Netherlands. June 6–9: ACM Press.	2011	HT	C-Memory	
Michel, J.-B., Shen, Y. K., Aiden, A. P., Veres, A., Gray, M. K., Team, T. G., et al. (2011). Quantitative Analysis of Culture Using Millions of Digitized Books. In Science, 331(6014), 176 - 182.	2011	Science	C-Memory	
Yeung, C.-m. A., & Jatowt, A. (2011). Studying How the Past is Remembered: Towards Computational History through Large Scale Text Mining. In Proceedings of the CIKM2011: 20th ACM Conference on Information and Knowledge Management (pp. 1231 – 1240). Glasgow, Scotland, UK. October 24–28: ACM Press.	2011	CIKM	C-Memory	

== Web archives (W-archives) ==
Reference	Year	Conference/Journal	Main Scope	Comments
List of Web Archive Initiatives	2011		W-Archives	
Kahle, B. (1997, 03). Preserving the Internet. In Scientific American Magazine, 276(3), pp. 72 – 73.	1997	SAM	W-Archives	
Toyoda, M., & Kitsuregawa, M. (2005). A System for Visualizing and Analyzing the Evolution of the Web with a Time Series of Graphs. In HT2005: Proceedings of the 16th ACM Conference on Hypertext and Hypermedia (pp. 151 – 160). Salzburg, Austria. September 6–9: ACM Press.	2005	HT	W-Archives	
Efendioglu, D., Faschetti, C., & Parr, T. (2006). Chronica: a temporal web search engine. In D. Wolber, N. Calder, & ,. C. Brooks (Ed.), ICWE2006: Proceedings of the 6th International Conference on Web Engineering (pp. 119 – 120). Palo Alto, California, United States. July 11–14: ACM Press.	2006	ICWE	W-Archives	
Jatowt, A., Kawai, Y., Nakamura, S., Kidawara, Y., & Tanaka, K. (2006). Journey to the Past: Proposal of a Framework for Past Web Browser. In HT2006: Proceedings of the 17th Conference on Hypertext and Hypermedia (pp. 135 – 144). Odense, Denmark. August 22–25: ACM Press.	2006	HT	W-Archives	
Adar, E., Dontcheva, M., Fogarty, J., & Weld, D. S. (2008). Zoetrope: Interacting with the Ephemeral Web. In S. B. Cousins, & M. Beaudouin-Lafon (Ed.), UIST 2008: Proceedings of the 21st Annual ACM Symposium on User Interface Software and Technology (pp. 239 – 248). Monterey, CA, United States. October 19–22: ACM Press.	2008	UIST	W-Archives	
Song, S., & JaJa, J. (2008). Archiving Temporal Web Information: Organization of Web Contents for Fast Access and Compact Storage. Technical Report UMIACS-TR-2008-08, University of Maryland Institute for Advanced Computer Studies, Maryland, MD, United States.	2008	Technical Report	W-Archives	
Gomes, D., Miranda, J., & Costa, M. (2011). A Survey on Web Archiving Initiatives. In TPDL2011: Proceedings of the 15th international conference on Theory and practice of digital libraries: research and advanced technology for digital libraries (pp. 408 – 420). Berlin, Germany. September 25–29: Springer-Verlag	2011	TPDL	W-Archives	
Anand, A., Bedathur, S., Berberich, K., & Schenkel, R. (2012). Index Maintenance for Time-Travel Text Search. In SIGIR2012: Proceedings of the 35th Annual International ACM SIGIR Conference on Research and Development in Information Retrieval, (pp. 235 – 243). Portland, United States. August 12–16. ACM Press	2012	SIGIR	W-Archives	
Costa, M., & Silva, M.J. (2012). Evaluating Web Archive Search Systems. In WISE2012: Proceedings of the 13th International Conference on Web Information System Engineering, (pp. 440 – 454). Paphos, Cyprus. November 28–30. Springer-Verlag	2012	WISE	W-Archives	

== Topic detection and tracking (TDT) ==
Reference	Year	Conference/Journal	Main Scope	Comments
Allan, J., Carbonell, J., Doddington, G., & Yamron, J. (1998). Topic Detection and Tracking Pilot Study Final Report. In Proceedings of the DARPA Broadcast News Transcription and Understanding Workshop, (pp. 194 – 218). Lansdowne, Virginia, United States. February.	1998	Technical Report	TDT	
Swan, R., & Allan, J. (1999). Extracting Significant Time-Varying Features from Text. In CIKM 1999: Proceedings of the 8th International ACM Conference on Information and Knowledge Management (pp. 38 – 45). Kansas City, Missouri, United States. November 2–6: ACM Press.	1999	CIKM	TDT	
Swan, R., & Jensen, D. (2000). TimeMines: Constructing Timelines with Statistical Models of Word Usage. In M. Grobelnik, D. Mladenic, & N. Milic-Frayling (Ed.), TM2000: Proceedings of the Workshop on Text Mining associated to KDD2000: 6th ACM SIGKDD International Conference on Knowledge Discovery and Data Mining (pp. 73 – 80). Boston, Massachusetts, United States. August 20–23: ACM Press.	2000	KDD - TM	TDT	
Swan, R., & Allan, J. (2000). Automatic Generation of Overview Timelines. In SIGIR 2000: Proceedings of the 23rd Annual International ACM SIGIR Conference on Research and Development in Information Retrieval (pp. 49 – 56). Athens, Greece. July 24–28: ACM Press.	2000	SIGIR	TDT	
Makkonen, J., & Ahonen-Myka, H. (2003). Utilizing Temporal Information in Topic Detection and Tracking. In T. Koch, & I. T. Solvberg (Eds.), In Lecture Notes in Computer Science - Research and Advanced Technology for Digital Libraries, ECDL 2003: 7th European Conference on Research and Advances Technology for Digital Libraries (Vol. 2769/2004, pp. 393 – 404). Trondheim, Norway. August 17–22: Springer Berlin / Heidelberg.	2003	ECDL	TDT	
Shaparenko, B., Caruana, R., Gehrke, J., & Joachims, T. (2005). Identifying Temporal Paterns and Key Players in Document Collections. In TDM2005: Proceedings of the Workshop on Temporal Data Mining associated to ICDM2005 (pp. 165 – 174). Houston, United States. November 27–30: IEEE Press.	2005	ICDM - TDM	TDT	
Mori, M., Miura, T., & Shioya, I. (2006). Topic Detection and Tracking for News Web Pages. In WIC2006: IEEE Main Conference Proceedings of the IEEE/WIC/ACM International Conference on Web Intelligence (pp. 338 – 342). Hong Kong, China. December 18–22: IEEE Computer Society Press.	2006	WIC	TDT	
Kim, P., Myaeng, S.H. (2004). Usefulness of Temporal Information Automatically Extracted from News Articles for Topic Tracking. In TALIP:Journal of ACM Transactions on Asian Language Information Processing (pp. 227 – 242). New York, United States.	2004	TALIP	TDT	
