= Altbib =

Bibliography on Alternatives to the Use of Live Vertebrates in Biomedical Research and Testing, or Altbib, is a bibliography available online to assist in identifying methods and procedures helpful in supporting the development, testing, application, and validation of alternatives to the use of vertebrates in biomedical research and toxicology testing. The bibliography is produced from MEDLARS database searches analyzed by experts from the Toxicology and Environmental Health Information Program (TEHIP) of the Specialized Information Services Division (SIS) of the National Library of Medicine.

== See also ==
- Alternatives to animal testing
