= BioCreative =

Biomedical text mining evaluation challenge

BioCreAtIvE (A critical assessment of text mining methods in molecular biology) consists in a community-wide effort for evaluating information extraction and text mining developments in the biological domain.

It was preceded by the Knowledge Discovery and Data Mining (KDD) Challenge Cup for detection of gene mentions.

== Community Challenges ==
=== First edition (2004-2005) ===
Three main tasks were posed at the first BioCreAtIvE challenge: the entity extraction task, the gene name normalization task, and the functional annotation of gene products task. The data sets produced by this contest serve as a Gold Standard training and test set to evaluate and train Bio-NER tools and annotation extraction tools.

=== Second edition (2006-2007) ===
The second BioCreAtIvE challenge (2006-2007) had also 3 tasks: detection of gene mentions, extraction of unique idenfiers for genes and extraction information related to physical protein-protein interactions. It counted with participation of 44 teams from 13 countries.

=== Third edition (2011-2012) ===
The third edition of BioCreative included for the first time the InterActive Task (IAT), designed to evaluate the practical usability of text mining tools in real-world biocuration tasks.

=== Fifth edition (2016) ===
BioCreative V had 5 different tracks, including an interactive task (IAT) for usability of text mining systems and a track using the BioC format for curating information for BioGRID.

== See also ==
- Biocuration
