= Healia =

Vertical health search engine

Healia, Inc.
- Company type: Subsidiary
- Industry: Search engine, Health informatics
- Founded: 2001
- Founder: Dr. Tom Eng
- Fate: Acquired by Meredith Corporation (2007)
- Headquarters: Bellevue, Washington, U.S.
- Area served: Worldwide
- Key people: Dr. Tom Eng (President)
- Services: Consumer health search
- Parent: Meredith Corporation (2007–2021); Dotdash Meredith (2021–present)
- Website: www.healia.com

Healia is a health vertical search engine and online health community. Healia's search engine uses algorithms to assess quality and to categorize Web documents. Healia Communities is composed of online health support groups that enable people to share health experiences, connect with others, and ask questions of peers and health professionals. Healia, Inc. is located in Bellevue, Washington, USA.

== Quality Index Score and Personalization Algorithms ==
Healia use patent-pending Quality Index Score to judge the quality of search results. Healia uses algorithms to assess the content and audience focus of health Web pages and allows users to filter search results by those characteristics.

== Management team ==
President & Founder: Thomas R. Eng (VMD, MPH).

Thomas (Tom) Eng received a Small Business Innovation Research (SBIR) Award from the National Institutes of Health(NIH) in 2001 to develop this website. The National Cancer Institute (part of the NIH) assisted with research and development, and Healia was incorporated in March 2005. It became available to the public in September 2006.

Healia was acquired by Meredith Corporation in June 2007.

Healia's CTO is Mike Schultz (PhD) who runs the technology development.

== AMSA Partnership ==
In 2009, Healia partnered with the American Medical Student Association (AMSA) to provide medical students an opportunity to answer health questions posed in Healia Communities alongside licensed professionals.

== Drawbacks ==
The searching results are heavily US biased with many initial search results finding information from American web sites.

== See also ==
- Medical literature retrieval
