= Medical Subject Headings =

Controlled vocabulary for medical information

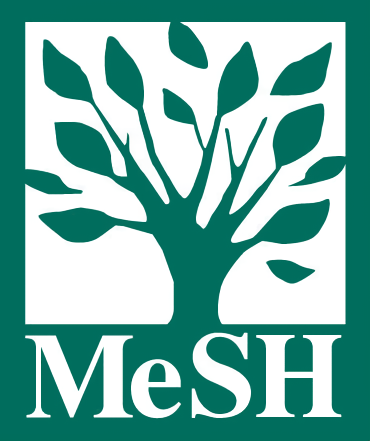

Content
- Description: Medical Subject Headings
- Data types captured: controlled vocabulary

Contact
- Research center: United States National Library of Medicine; National Center for Biotechnology Information
- Laboratory: United States National Library of Medicine
- Authors: F. B. Rogers
- Primary citation: PMID 13982385

Access
- Website: nlm.nih.gov/mesh

Medical Subject Headings (MeSH) is a comprehensive controlled vocabulary for the purpose of indexing journal articles and books in the life sciences. It serves as a thesaurus of index terms that facilitates searching. Created and updated by the United States National Library of Medicine (NLM), it is used by the MEDLINE/PubMed article database and by NLM's catalog of book holdings. MeSH is also used by ClinicalTrials.gov registry to classify which diseases are studied by trials registered in ClinicalTrials.

MeSH was introduced in the 1960s, with the NLM's own index catalogue and the subject headings of the Quarterly Cumulative Index Medicus (1940 edition) as precursors. The yearly printed version of MeSH was discontinued in 2007; MeSH is now available only online. It can be browsed and downloaded free of charge through PubMed. Originally in English, MeSH has been translated into numerous other languages and allows retrieval of documents from different origins.

== Structure ==
MeSH vocabulary is divided into four types of terms. The main ones are the "headings" (also known as MeSH headings or descriptors), which describe the subject of each article (e.g., "Body Weight", "Brain Edema" or "Critical Care Nursing"). Most of these are accompanied by a short description or definition, links to related descriptors, and a list of synonyms or very similar terms (known as entry terms). MeSH contains approximately 30,000 entries (as of 2025) and is updated annually to reflect changes in medicine and medical terminology. MeSH terms are arranged in alphabetic order and in a hierarchical structure by subject categories with more specific terms arranged beneath broader terms. When we search for a MeSH term, the most specific MeSH terms are automatically included in the search. This is known as the extended search or explode of that MeSH term. This additional information and the hierarchical structure (see below) make the MeSH essentially a thesaurus, rather than a plain subject headings list.

The second type of term, MeSH subheadings or qualifiers (see below), can be used with MeSH terms to more completely describe a particular aspect of a subject, such as adverse, diagnostic or genetic effects. For example, the drug therapy of asthma is displayed as asthma/drug therapy.

The remaining two types of term are those that describe the type of material that the article represents (publication types), and supplementary concept records (SCR) which describes substances such as chemical products and drugs that are not included in the headings (see below as "Supplements").

=== Descriptor hierarchy ===
The descriptors or subject headings are arranged in a hierarchy. A given descriptor may appear at several locations in the hierarchical tree. The tree locations carry systematic labels known as tree numbers, and consequently one descriptor can carry several tree numbers. For example, the descriptor "Digestive System Neoplasms" has the tree numbers C06.301 and C04.588.274; C stands for Diseases, C06 for Digestive System Diseases and C06.301 for Digestive System Neoplasms; C04 for Neoplasms, C04.588 for Neoplasms By Site, and C04.588.274 also for Digestive System Neoplasms. The tree numbers of a given descriptor are subject to change as MeSH is updated. Every descriptor also carries a unique alphanumerical ID that will not change.

=== Descriptions ===
Most subject headings come with a short description or definition. See the MeSH description for diabetes type 2 as an example. The explanatory text is written by the MeSH team based on their standard sources if not otherwise stated. References are mostly encyclopaedias and standard textbooks of the subject areas. References for specific statements in the descriptions are not given; instead, readers are referred to the bibliography.

=== Qualifiers ===
In addition to the descriptor hierarchy, MeSH contains a small number of standard qualifiers (also known as subheadings), which can be added to descriptors to narrow down the topic. For example, "Measles" is a descriptor and "epidemiology" is a qualifier; "Measles/epidemiology" describes the subheading of epidemiological articles about Measles. The "epidemiology" qualifier can be added to all other disease descriptors. Not all descriptor/qualifier combinations are allowed since some of them may be meaningless. In all there are 83 different qualifiers.

=== Supplements ===
In addition to the descriptors, MeSH also contains some 318,000 supplementary concept records. These do not belong to the controlled vocabulary as such; instead they enlarge the thesaurus and contain links to the closest fitting descriptor to be used in a MEDLINE search. Many of these records describe chemical substances.

== Use in Medline/PubMed ==
In MEDLINE/PubMed, every journal article is indexed with about 10–15 subject headings, subheadings and supplementary concept records, with some of them designated as major and marked with an asterisk, indicating the article's major topics. When performing a MEDLINE search via PubMed, entry terms are automatically translated into (i.e., mapped to) the corresponding descriptors with a good degree of reliability; it is recommended to check the 'Details tab' in PubMed to see how a search formulation was translated. By default, a search for a descriptor will include all the descriptors in the hierarchy below the given one. PubMed does not apply automatic mapping of the term in the following circumstances: by writing the quoted phrase (e.g. "kidney allograft"), when truncated on the asterisk (e.g. kidney allograft *), and when looking with field labels (e.g. Cancer [ti]).

== Use at ClinicalTrials.gov ==
At ClinicalTrials.gov, each trial has keywords that describe the trial. The ClinicalTrials.gov team assigns each trial two sets of MeSH terms. One set is for the conditions studied by the trial and the other for the set of interventions used in the trial. The XML file that can be downloaded for each trial contains these MeSH keywords. The XML file also has a comment that says: "the assignment of MeSH keywords is done by imperfect algorithm".

== Categories ==
The top-level categories in the MeSH descriptor hierarchy are:

- Anatomy [A]
- Organisms [B]
- Diseases [C]
- Chemicals and Drugs [D]
- Analytical, Diagnostic and Therapeutic Techniques, and Equipment [E]
- Psychiatry and Psychology [F]
- Phenomena and Processes [G]
- Disciplines and Occupations [H]
- Anthropology, Education, Sociology and Social Phenomena [I]
- Technology, Industry, and Agriculture [J]
- Humanities [K]
- Information Science [L]
- Named Groups [M]
- Health Care [N]
- Publication Characteristics [V]
- Geographicals [Z]

== See also ==
- Library of Congress Subject Headings – Controlled vocabulary of bibliographic index terms
- Medical classification – Use of schemes of standardized codes
- Medical literature retrieval
