= Trip (search engine) =

Clinical search engine

- Developer(s): Trip Database Ltd
- Type: Search engine
- License: Proprietary
- Website: Trip

Trip is a free clinical search engine used in the United Kingdom to help clinicians identify research evidence, in part for creating systematic reviews.

== History ==
The site was created in 1997 by Jon Brassey and Chris Price in Gwent, South Wales. In 1999, one source reported it aggregated results from 25 websites. In 2003, Trip became a subscription-only service. This was abandoned In September 2006 and in 2015 followed a freemium business model. Originally "Trip" stood for Turning Research Into Practice.

== Usage ==
Between May 2004 and May 2005, 620,735 searches were undertaken.
