= Medical literature retrieval =

Medical literature retrieval or medical document retrieval is an activity that uses professional methods for medical research papers retrieval, report and other data to improve medicine research and practice.

== Medical search engine ==
=== Professional medical search engine ===
- PubMed
- GoPubMed
- Pubget
- Scopus
- eTBLAST
- Cochrane Reviews, The Cochrane Library
- SciELO
- Twease

==== Meta-search tools ====
- Trip
- NLM Gateway
- Entrez, NLM's cross-database search
- SUMSearch

=== Consumer health search engine ===
- MedlinePlus by the U.S. NLM
- Healthfinder by the U.S. HHS
- Mednar
- Healthline
- Medstory
- Healia

== Search strategy ==
Cochrane guidance recommends structuring the strategy around the main concepts of the review, usually drawn from PICO (population, intervention, comparison, outcome) together with study design: terms describing the same concept are combined with the Boolean operator OR, and distinct concepts are combined with AND, while NOT should be avoided because it can silently discard relevant records.

== See also ==
- European Federation for Medical Informatics
- Evidence-based medicine
- Health informatics
- International Medical Informatics Association
- List of search engines § Medical
- Medical Subject Headings
