= Krysta Svore =

American computer scientist

Krysta M. Svore
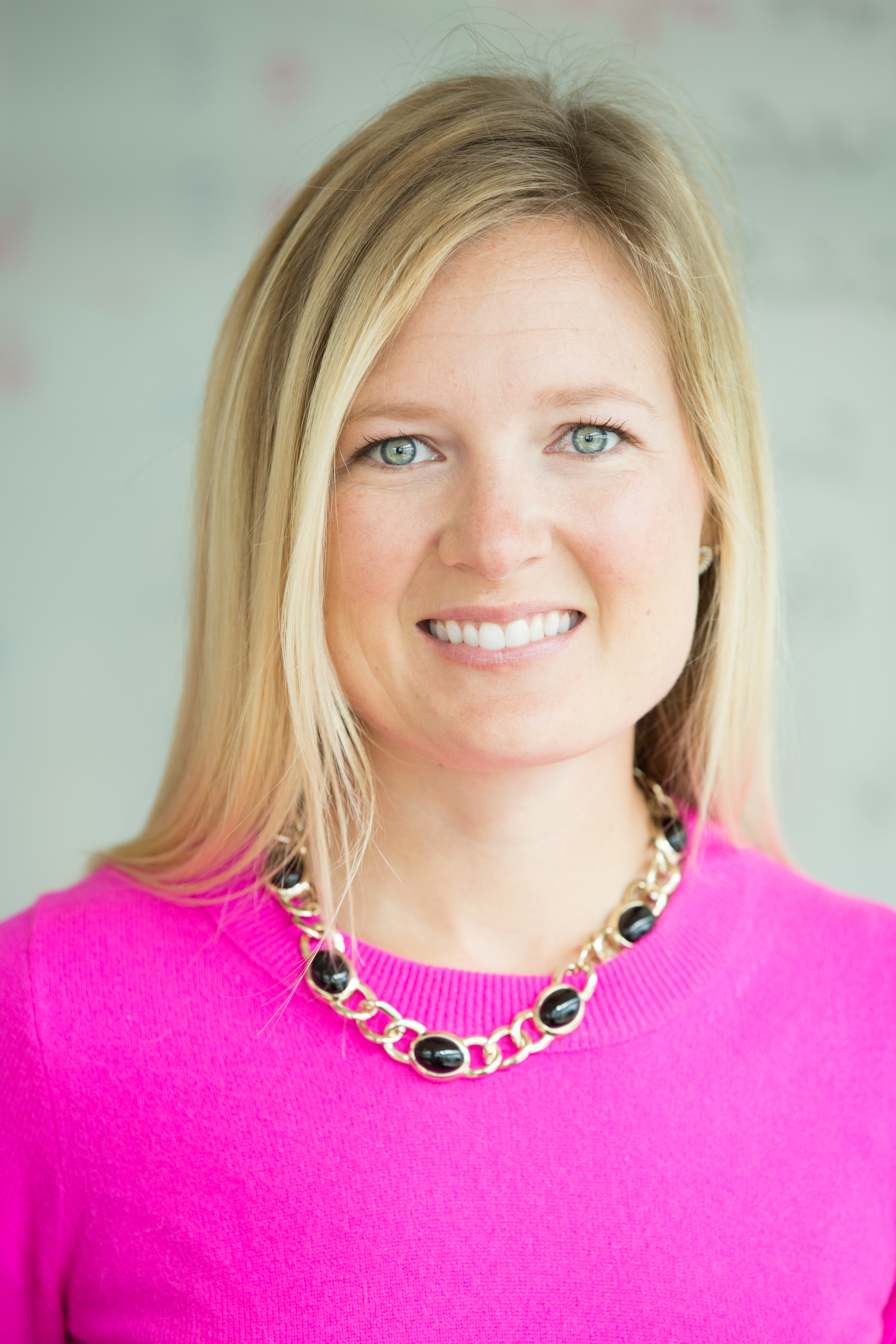
- Born: Krysta Marie Svore; 1979 (age 46–47); Seattle, Washington, U.S.
- Education: Princeton University (BA); Columbia University (PhD)
- Known for: Quantum computing
- Awards: AAAS Fellow (2021); 39 Most Powerful Female Engineers (2018); Kavli Fellow
- Scientific career
- Fields: Computer science, Quantum computing
- Workplaces: Nvidia
- Thesis: Software Tools and Failure Thresholds for Reliable, Scalable, Fault-tolerant Quantum Computation (2006)
- Doctoral advisor: Al Aho, Joseph F. Traub

Krysta Marie Svore (born 1979) is an American computer scientist specializing in quantum computing. She is currently Vice President of Applied Research in Quantum Computing at Nvidia.

She previously led the Microsoft Azure Quantum software team (formerly the Quantum Architectures and Computation group at Microsoft Research) for Microsoft in Redmond, Washington, developing Azure Quantum and bringing the first quantum computers to the Microsoft Azure cloud. Formerly she served as the Distinguished Engineer and Vice President of Quantum Software.

Beyond quantum computing, she has also worked on research in machine learning.

== Education and career ==
Svore is originally from the Seattle, Washington area. She majored in mathematics at Princeton University, and became intrigued by the possibilities of quantum computing through a junior-year seminar on cryptography given by Andrew Wiles, in which she learned of the ability of quantum computers using Shor's algorithm to break the RSA cryptosystem.

She completed her Ph.D. in 2006 at Columbia University, with highest distinction, under the joint supervision of Alfred Aho and Joseph F. Traub. Her dissertation was Software Tools and Failure Thresholds for Reliable, Scalable, Fault-tolerant Quantum Computation.

She joined Microsoft Research in 2006, initially working on problems in machine learning but later focusing more heavily on her work with quantum computing.

Svore also serves on the National Quantum Initiative Advisory Committee and the Advanced Scientific Computing Advisory Committee for U.S. Department of Energy.

== Recognition ==
Svore was named to the 2021 class of Fellows of the American Association for the Advancement of Science. She was named a Fellow of the American Physical Society in 2023, "for advancing the development of software architectures and empowering quantum scientists through leadership to design practical and impactful algorithms".

In 2022, Svore was elected as a fellow of the Washington State Academy of Sciences for "advancing the field of computing through the development of new programming languages and algorithms for quantum computing, including pioneering work on arithmetic and machine learning operations on quantum computers, and for foundational contributions to the integration of machine learning into the development of scalable methods for web search."

She was named one of the 39 Most Powerful female engineers by Business Insider in 2018.
