= MEDLINE =

Biomedical bibliographical database

- Producer: U.S. National Library of Medicine (United States)
- History: 1879–present
- Languages: 40 languages for current journals, 60 for older journals

Access
- Cost: Free

Coverage
- Disciplines: Medicine, nursing, pharmacy, dentistry, veterinary medicine, health care, biology, biochemistry, molecular evolution, biomedicine, history of medicine, health services research, AIDS, toxicology and environmental health, molecular biology, complementary medicine, behavioral sciences, chemical sciences, bioengineering, health policy development, environmental science, marine biology, plant and animal science, biophysics
- Record depth: NLM Medical subject headings, abstracts, indexing
- Format coverage: Mostly academic journals; a small number of newspapers, magazines, and newsletters; over 40% are for cited articles published in the U.S., about 93% are published in English
- Temporal coverage: 1946–present
- No. of records: Over 29 million
- Update frequency: Daily; 2,000–4,000 references per update

Links
- Website: www.nlm.nih.gov/bsd/medline.html

MEDLINE (Medical Literature Analysis and Retrieval System Online, or MEDLARS Online) is a bibliographic database of life sciences and biomedical information. It includes bibliographic information for articles from academic journals covering medicine, nursing, pharmacy, dentistry, veterinary medicine, and health care. MEDLINE also covers much of the literature in biology and biochemistry, as well as fields such as molecular evolution.

Compiled by the United States National Library of Medicine (NLM), MEDLINE is freely available on the Internet and searchable via PubMed and NLM's National Center for Biotechnology Information's Entrez system.

== History ==
MEDLARS (Medical Literature Analysis and Retrieval System) was a computerised biomedical bibliographic retrieval system. It was launched by the National Library of Medicine in 1964 and was the first large-scale, computer-based, retrospective search service available to the general public.

=== Initial development of MEDLARS ===
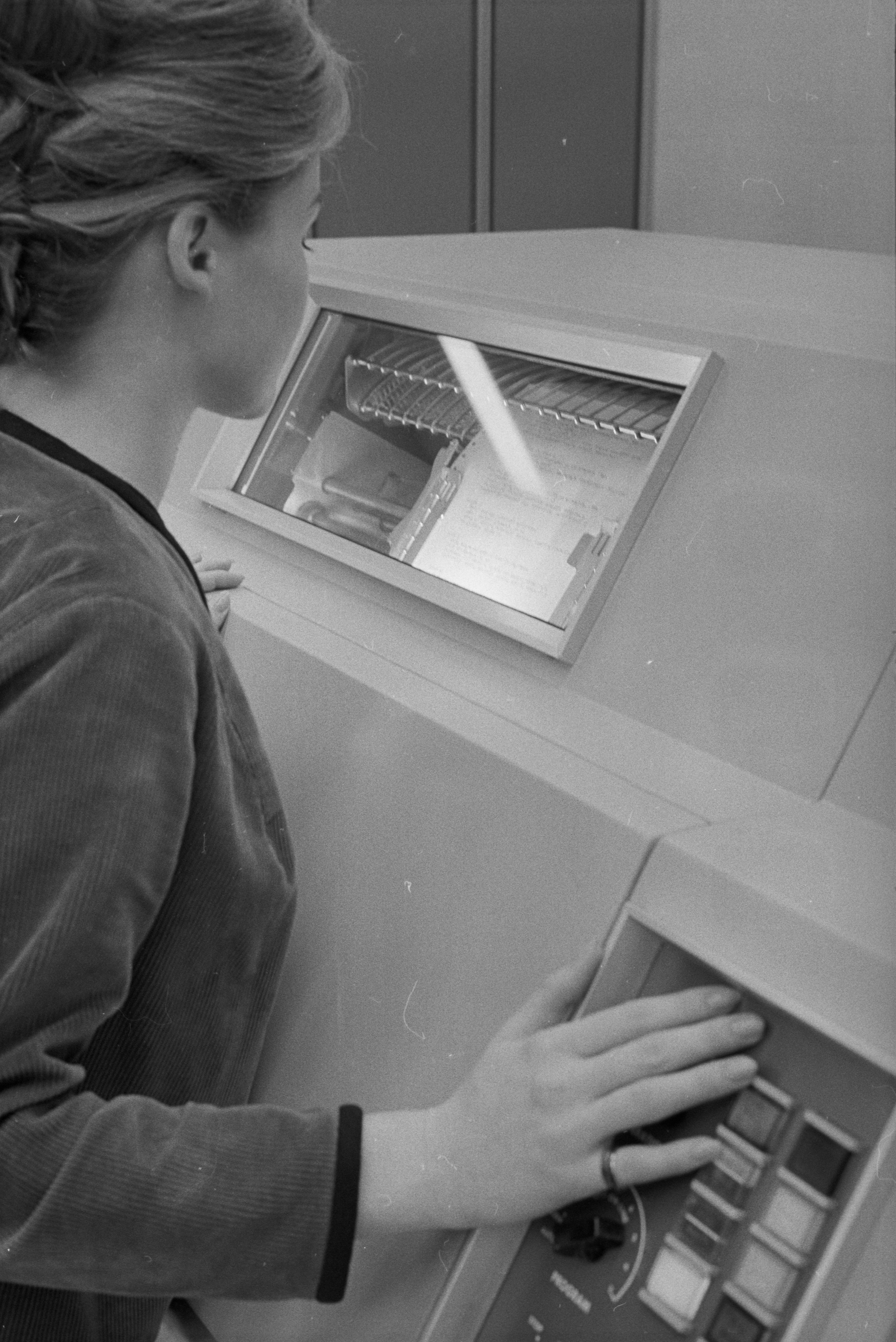
A woman at the National Library of Medicine accessing MEDLARS in 1964

Since 1879, the National Library of Medicine has published Index Medicus, a monthly guide to medical articles in thousands of journals. The huge volume of bibliographic citations was manually compiled. In 1957 the staff of the NLM started to plan the mechanization of the Index Medicus, prompted by a desire for a better way to manipulate all this information, not only for Index Medicus but also to produce subsidiary products. By 1960 a detailed specification was prepared, and by the spring of 1961, request for proposals were sent out to 72 companies to develop the system. As a result, a contract was awarded to the General Electric Company. A Minneapolis-Honeywell 800 computer, which was to run MEDLARS, was delivered to the NLM in March 1963, and Frank Bradway Rogers (Director of the NLM 1949 to 1963) said at the time, "... If all goes well, the January 1964 issue of Index Medicus will be ready to emerge from the system at the end of this year. It may be that this will mark the beginning of a new era in medical bibliography."

MEDLARS cost $3 million to develop, and at the time of its completion in 1964, no other publicly available, fully operational electronic storage and retrieval system of its magnitude existed. The original computer configuration operated from 1964 until its replacement by MEDLARS II in January 1975.

=== MEDLARS Online ===
In late 1971, an online version called MEDLINE (MEDLARS Online) became available as a way to do online searching of MEDLARS from remote medical libraries. This early system covered 239 journals and boasted that it could support as many as 25 simultaneous online users (remotely logged in from distant medical libraries) at one time. However, this system remained primarily in the hands of libraries, with researchers able to submit pre-programmed search tasks to librarians and obtain results on printouts, but rarely able to interact with the NLM computer output in real-time. This situation continued through the beginning of the 1990s and the rise of the World Wide Web.

In 1996, soon after most home computers began automatically bundling efficient web browsers, a free public version of MEDLINE was deployed. This system, called PubMed, was offered to the general online user in June 1997, when MEDLINE searches via the Web were demonstrated.

== Database ==
In December 2024, the database contained more than 38 million records from over 5,200 selected publications covering biomedicine and health from 1781 to the present. Originally, the database covered articles starting from 1965, but this has been enhanced, and records as far back as 1781 are now available within the main index. The database is freely accessible on the Internet via the PubMed interface, and new citations are added Tuesday through Saturday. For citations added during 1995–2003, about 48% are for cited articles published in the U.S., about 88% are published in English (overall about 84%), and about 76% have English abstracts written by authors of the articles.

=== Data quality ===
Being an aggregated source, the PubMed database suffers from multi-source problems such as inconsistent representations from the upstream data providers.

== Retrieval ==
MEDLINE uses Medical Subject Headings (MeSH) for information retrieval. Engines designed to search MEDLINE (such as Entrez and PubMed) generally use a Boolean expression combining MeSH terms, words in the abstract, and fields such as article title, author names, and publication date. Entrez and PubMed can also find articles similar to a given one based on a mathematical scoring system that takes into account the similarity of word content of the abstracts and titles of two articles.

MEDLINE added a publication type term for "randomized controlled trial" in 1991 and a MeSH subset systematic review in 2001.

== Importance ==
MEDLINE functions as an important resource for biomedical researchers and journal clubs from all over the world. Along with the Cochrane Library and a number of other databases, MEDLINE facilitates evidence-based medicine. Most systematic review articles published presently build on extensive searches of MEDLINE to identify articles that might be useful in the review. MEDLINE influences researchers in their choice of journals in which to publish.

== Inclusion of journals ==
More than 5,200 biomedical journals are indexed in MEDLINE. New journals are not included automatically or immediately. Several criteria for selection are applied. Selection is based on the recommendations of a panel, the Literature Selection Technical Review Committee, based on the scientific scope and quality of a journal. The Journals Database (one of the Entrez databases) contains information, such as its name abbreviation and publisher, about all journals included in Entrez, including PubMed. Journals that no longer meet the criteria are removed. Being indexed in MEDLINE gives a non-predatory identity to a journal.

== Usage ==
In 2023, MEDLINE contained 1.28 million indexed citations, and the PubMed database was searched 3.66 billion times.

For non-expert users seeking health and medicine topics, the NIH offers MedlinePlus, curated health information for consumers. In 2023, MedlinePlus pages were accessed 850 million times serving 440 million users.

== See also ==
- Altbib
- LILACS
- HubMed – an alternative interface to the PubMed medical literature database.
- Journalology
- eTBLAST – a natural language text similarity engine for MEDLINE and other text databases.
- Medscape
