= BioGRID =

Biological database

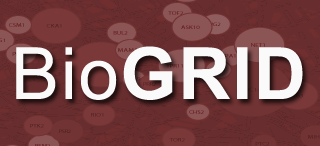

Content
- Description: BioGRID is a biomedical interaction repository with data compiled through comprehensive curation efforts.
- Data types captured: Protein Interactions, Genetic Interactions, Chemical Interactions, Post-Translational Modifications.
- Organisms: 80

Contact
- Research center: Université de Montréal, Princeton University, Mount Sinai Hospital (Toronto)
- Laboratory: Institut de Recherche en Immunologie et en Cancérologie, Lewis-Sigler Institute for Integrative Genomics, Lunenfeld-Tanenbaum Research Institute
- Authors: Lorrie Boucher, Ashton Breitkreutz, Bobby-Joe Breitkreutz, Christie Chang, Andrew Chatr-Aryamontri, Kara Dolinski, Sven Heinicke, Nadine Kolas, Lara O'Donnell, Sara Oster, Rose Oughtred, Jennifer Rust, Adnane Sellam, Chris Stark, Jean Tang, Chandra Theesfeld, Mike Tyers.
- Primary citation: Stark & al. (2006)

Access
- Data format: Custom flat files, PSI-MI, MITAB
- Website: thebiogrid.org
- Download URL: downloads.thebiogrid.org/BioGRID
- Web service URL: Yes - wiki.thebiogrid.org/doku.php/biogridrest

Tools
- Web: Advanced search, integrated network viewer, custom downloads, bulk retrieval/download

Miscellaneous
- Versioning: Yes
- Data release frequency: Monthly (4 Weeks)
- Version: 4.2.193; 1 January 2021; 5 years ago
- Curation policy: Yes - manual; Also focused curation efforts.
- Bookmarkable entities: Yes - both individual results and searches,

The Biological General Repository for Interaction Datasets (BioGRID) is a curated biological database of protein-protein interactions, genetic interactions, chemical interactions, and post-translational modifications created in 2003 (originally referred to as simply the General Repository for Interaction Datasets (GRID) by Mike Tyers, Bobby-Joe Breitkreutz, and Chris Stark at the Lunenfeld-Tanenbaum Research Institute at Mount Sinai Hospital. It strives to provide a comprehensive curated resource for all major model organism species while attempting to remove redundancy to create a single mapping of data. Users of The BioGRID can search for their protein, chemical or publication of interest and retrieve annotation, as well as curated data as reported, by the primary literature and compiled by in house large-scale curation efforts. The BioGRID is hosted in Toronto, Ontario, Canada and Dallas, Texas, United States and is partnered with the Saccharomyces Genome Database, FlyBase, WormBase, PomBase, and the Alliance of Genome Resources. The BioGRID is funded by the NIH and CIHR. BioGRID is an observer member of the International Molecular Exchange Consortium (IMEx).

== History ==
The BioGRID was originally published and released as simply the General Repository for Interaction Datasets but was later renamed to the BioGRID in order to more concisely describe the project, and help distinguish it from several GRID Computing projects with a similar name. Originally separated into organism specific databases, the newest version now provides a unified front end allowing for searches across several organisms simultaneously. The BioGRID was developed initially as a project at the Lunenfeld-Tanenbaum Research Institute at Mount Sinai Hospital but has since expanded to include teams at the Institut de Recherche en Immunologie et en Cancérologie at the Université de Montréal and the Lewis-Sigler Institute for Integrative Genomics at Princeton University. The BioGRID's original focus was on curation of binary protein-protein and genetic interactions, but has expanded over several updates to incorporate curated post-translational modification data, chemical interaction data, and complex multi-gene/protein interactions. Moreover, on a monthly basis, the BioGRID continues to expand curated data and also develop and release new tools, data from comprehensive targeted curation projects, and perform targeted scientific analysis.

== Curation of Genetic, Protein, and Chemical Interactions ==
The Biological General Repository for Interaction Datasets (BioGRID) is an open access database that houses genetic and protein interactions curated from the primary biomedical literature for all major model organism species and humans. As of 18 October 2020, the BioGRID contains 1,928 million interactions as drawn from 63,083 publications that represent 71 model organisms. At the start of 2021 it already contained more than 2,0 million biological interactions, 29,023 chemical-protein interactions, and 506,485 post-translational modifications collectively curated from 75,988 publications for more than 80 species. BioGRID data are freely distributed through partner model organism databases and meta-databases and are directly downloadable in a variety of formats. BioGRID curation is coordinated through an Interaction Management System (IMS) that facilitates the compilation interaction records through structured evidence codes, phenotype ontologies, and gene annotation. The BioGRID architecture has been improved in order to support a broader range of interaction and post-translational modification types, to allow the representation of more complex multi-gene/protein interactions, to account for cellular phenotypes through structured ontologies, to expedite curation through semi-automated text mining approaches, and to enhance curation quality control. Through comprehensive curation efforts, BioGRID now includes a virtually complete set of interactions reported to date in the primary literature for budding yeast (Saccharomyces cerevisiae), thale cress (Arabidopsis thaliana), and fission yeast (Schizosaccharomyces pombe).

== Themed Curation Projects ==
Due to the overwhelming size of published scientific literature containing human (Homo sapiens) gene, protein, and chemical interactions, BioGRID has taken a targeted, project-based approach to curation of human interaction data in manageable collections of high impact data. These themed curation projects represent central biological processes with disease relevance such as chromatin modification, autophagy, and the ubiquitin-proteasome system or diseases of interest including glioblastoma, Fanconi Anemia, and COVID-19. As of 18 October 2020, BioGRID themed curation project efforts have resulted in the extraction of 424,631 interactions involving 2,361 proteins from more than 37,000 scientific articles.

== Curation of Genome-Wide CRISPR Screens ==
CRISPR-based genetic screens have now been reported in numerous publications that link gene function to cell viability, chemical and stress resistance, and other phenotypes. To increase the accessibility of CRISPR screen data and facilitate assignment of protein function, BioGRID has developed an embedded resource called the Open Repository of CRISPR Screens (ORCS) to house and distribute manually curated, comprehensive collections of CRISPR screen datasets using Cas9 and other CRISPR nucleases. As of 18 October 2020, BioGRID-ORCS contains more than 1,042 CRISPR screens curated from 114 publications representing more than 60,000 unique genes across three species human (Homo sapiens), fruit fly (Drosophila melanogaster), and house mouse (Mus musculus) in over 670 cell lines and 17 phenotypes.

== Supported Organisms ==
The following organisms are currently supported within the BioGRID, and each has curated interaction data available according to the latest statistics.

- Anopheles gambiae PEST (African malaria mosquito)
- Apis mellifera (honey bee)
- Arabidopsis thaliana (thale cress)
- Bacillus subtilis 168
- Bos taurus (cow)
- Caenorhabditis elegans (nematode worm)
- Candida albicans SC5314
- Canis familiaris (dog)
- Cavia porcellus (guinea pig)
- Chlamydomonas reinhardtii (green algae)
- Chlorocebus sabaeus (green monkey)
- Cricetulus griseus (Chinese hamster)
- Danio rerio (zebrafish)
- Dictyostelium discoideum AX4 (slime mold)
- Drosophila melanogaster (fruit fly)
- Emericella nidulans FGSC A4
- Equus caballus (horse)
- Escherichia coli (E. coli)
- Felis catus (cat)
- Gallus gallus (chicken)
- Glycine max (soybean)
- Hepatitis C Virus
- Homo sapiens (human)
- Human Herpesvirus (1,2,3,4,5,6A,6B,7,8)
- Human Immunodeficiency Virus 1 (HIV-1)
- Human Immunodeficiency Virus 2 (HIV-2)
- Human Papillomavirus (HPV, 10, 16, 32, 5, 6B, 7, 9)
- Leishmania major
- Macaca mulatta (rhesus monkey)
- Meleagris gallopavo (turkey)
- Middle East respiratory syndrome–related coronavirus (MERS-CoV)
- Monodelphis domestica (gray short-tailed opossum)
- Mus musculus (house mouse)
- Mycobacterium tuberculosis H37Rv
- Mycoplasma pneumoniae M129
- Neurospora crassa OR74A
- Nicotiana tomentosiformis
- Oryctolagus cuniculus (rabbit)
- Oryza sativa Japonica (Japanese rice)
- Ovis aries (sheep)
- Pan troglodytes (chimpanzee)
- Pediculus humanus (a type louse that infects humans)
- Plasmodium falciparum 3D7 (malaria parasite)
- Rattus norvegicus (Norway rat)
- Ricinus communis (castor bean)
- Saccharomyces cerevisiae (budding yeast)
- Schizosaccharomyces pombe (fission yeast)
- Selaginella moellendorffii
- Severe acute respiratory syndrome coronavirus (SARS-CoV)
- Severe acute respiratory syndrome coronavirus 2 (SARS-CoV-2)
- Simian Immunodeficiency Virus
- Solanum lycopersicum (tomato)
- Solanum tuberosum (potato)
- Sorghum bicolor (sorghum)
- Streptococcus pneumoniae (pneumococcus)
- Strongylocentrotus purpuratus (purple urchin)
- Sus scrofa (pig)
- Tobacco Mosaic Virus
- Ustilago maydis 521 (corn smut)
- Vaccinia Virus
- Vitis vinifera (common grape vine)
- Xenopus laevis (African clawed frog)
- Zea mays (corn)

== Funding for BioGRID ==
BioGRID is funded by grants from the National Institutes of Health and the Canadian Institutes of Health Research
