= Ann Barrett =

British oncologist (1943–2026)

Ann Barrett OBE
- Born: Ann Brown; 27 February 1943; Southgate, London, England
- Died: 18 March 2026 (aged 83); Cambridge, England
- Education: MB BS, LRCP and MRCS (1968); Fellow of the Royal College of Radiologists (FRCR) (1974); MD (1983)
- Medical career
- Profession: Oncologist
- Field: Radiation therapy; Paediatric oncology
- Institutions: Royal Marsden Hospital; University of Glasgow; Beatson Oncology Centre; University of East Anglia; Norfolk and Norwich University Hospitals NHS Foundation Trust
- Notable works: Cancer in Children: Clinical Management; Practical Radiotherapy Planning (1985)
- Awards: President's Medal, RCR (2005); Lifetime Achievement Award, ESTRO (2009); Emmanuel van der Schueren Award, ESTRO (2016)

Ann Barrett OBE (née Brown; 27 February 1943 – 18 March 2026) was a British oncologist. She held the University of Glasgow's first Chair of Radiation Oncology from 1986, directed the Beatson Oncology Centre from 1987 to 1991, and later served as deputy dean of Norwich Medical School and Emeritus Professor of Oncology at the University of East Anglia. She was elected a founding Fellow of the Academy of Medical Sciences in 1998 and was appointed Officer of the Order of the British Empire in 2010 for services to medicine.

Barrett's career coincided with the emergence of medical oncology as a distinct specialty in the United Kingdom. She was described as a pioneer of multidisciplinary cancer care, particularly through her work to integrate radiotherapy, chemotherapy and surgical oncology in routine clinical practice, and through efforts to support patients beyond active treatment. Her clinical research included early total body irradiation protocols for bone marrow transplant conditioning and UK collaborative studies in paediatric radiotherapy, including work on Hodgkin lymphoma and treatment of the central nervous system in childhood leukaemia.

== Life and career ==
Barrett was born Ann Brown in 1943 in Southgate, London, the daughter of journalist Robert Douglas Brown and primary schoolteacher Elsie Mary Brown, née Warner. She attended Queen Elizabeth's School for Girls in Barnet, London, initially specialising in languages at A-level. She married the haematologist John Barrett in 1970, and used the surname professionally thereafter.

=== Training and early career ===
Barrett studied medicine at St Bartholomew's Hospital in London, qualifying with MB BS, MRCS Eng., and LRCP Lond. in 1968. While at Barts she studied under Ruth Redpath, who inspired an interest in holistic medicine and care beyond active treatment. Between 1968 and 1976, she held junior posts at St Bartholomew's, University College Hospital, the Middlesex Hospital, Mount Vernon Hospital and the Westminster Hospital, where she later worked as a locum consultant radiotherapist.

She became a Fellow of the Faculty of Radiologists in 1974, after passing the April examination for the F.F.R.; the Faculty became the Royal College of Radiologists the following year.

In 1976, she worked in Paris at the Institut Gustave Roussy and as Chef de Clinique at the Hôpital Tenon, during which time she translated the French paediatric oncologist Odile Schweisguth's textbook Tumeurs solides de l'enfant into English.

Barrett returned from Paris to join the Royal Marsden Hospital in 1977, where she remained for around ten years, progressing from lecturer to senior lecturer and consultant. She developed a specialist interest in paediatric oncology and cancer in young people, including radiotherapy for childhood brain tumours and irradiation of the central nervous system in children with leukaemia and other cancers, and in 1977 was one of the founders of the UK Children's Cancer Study Group, established to coordinate clinical trials and the collection of data on childhood cancers. Her clinical work at the Marsden took place before the widespread availability of modern computerised imaging and radiotherapy planning systems, when treatment fields and doses had to be planned manually and in close collaboration with physicists. During this period, she was awarded MD Lond. in 1983.

=== Glasgow and the Beatson Oncology Centre ===
In 1986, Barrett was appointed as the first professor of radiation oncology at the University of Glasgow, taking up the Chair of Radiation Oncology that had been founded the previous year. Her appointment formed part of a wider integration of Glasgow's non-surgical oncology specialties, alongside the renaming of the Cancer Research Campaign Chair as Medical Oncology and closer collaboration between medical and radiation oncology in teaching, research and therapy. This collaboration included a joint MSc course in oncology, which Barrett introduced as the United Kingdom's first MSc in clinical oncology.

Barrett helped establish the Beatson Oncology Centre, formed in 1988 through the integration of Glasgow's Department of Medical Oncology with Radiation Oncology at the Western Infirmary, and served as its director until 1991. The centre was Scotland's largest cancer treatment centre and one of the first in the United Kingdom to introduce multidisciplinary meetings and clinics. In 2001, Barrett left the Beatson Oncology Centre, publicly citing underinvestment and its effect on standards of care. Her departure was one of three consultant resignations that led Scotland's health minister to request an urgent report into the centre, with outside experts subsequently brought in to advise on its management and future direction.

Barrett also served as a director of the Maggie Keswick Jencks Cancer Caring Centres Trust (Glasgow) from 1997 to 2001, and was later described as having been involved in setting up Maggie's Centre in Glasgow.

=== University of East Anglia and Norwich ===
After leaving Glasgow, Barrett moved to Norwich. In 2002, she joined the newly established Norwich Medical School at the University of East Anglia (UEA) as deputy dean and Foundation Chair of Oncology, becoming the school's first professor of oncology; she also served as lead clinician for oncology at the Norfolk and Norwich University Hospital. The medical school was created through a collaboration between UEA and the hospital, whose opening gave it teaching-hospital status.

At Norwich, Barrett contributed to the development of the medical curriculum, including clinical exposure from the first year and longitudinal communication-skills teaching. She remained at UEA until her retirement in 2008, later holding the title of Emeritus Professor of Oncology.

=== Professional leadership and advisory roles ===
Barrett held senior roles in UK and European clinical oncology. Within the Royal College of Radiologists, she chaired the Standing Scottish Committee from 1992 to 1995, served as registrar of the Faculty of Clinical Oncology from 2000 to 2002, and as its dean and an RCR vice-president from 2002 to 2004. She was president of the Scottish Radiological Society from 1995 to 1997, and president of the European Society for Therapeutic Radiology and Oncology (ESTRO) from 1997 to 1999.

She also held leadership roles in clinical trials and radiotherapy quality assurance. Barrett chaired the steering committee for the multicentre continuous hyperfractionated accelerated radiotherapy (CHART) trial in non-small-cell lung cancer, and the independent Trial Steering Committee for the UK Standardisation of Breast Radiotherapy (START) trials of hypofractionated radiotherapy for early breast cancer. From 2001 to 2003, she led the REACT task group within ESTRO's European Commission-funded ESQUIRE quality-assurance programme, which developed methods for recording radiotherapy outcomes and treatment-related morbidity and for optimising post-treatment follow-up across European centres. She was also a co-author of a national survey of UK radiotherapy fractionation practice that received the Royal College of Radiologists' Frank Ellis Medal in 2006.

Barrett also contributed to public advisory work on radiation and radiotherapy service planning. From 1988 to 1993, she was a member of the Committee on Medical Aspects of Radiation in the Environment (COMARE), then associated with the National Radiological Protection Board. She later served on the National Radiotherapy Advisory Group (NRAG), which advised ministers on radiotherapy services in England; its recommendations were subsequently cited in the Department of Health's 2007 Cancer Reform Strategy.

== Research and publications ==
Barrett's research interests centred on total body irradiation before bone marrow transplantation and on radiotherapy in children. At the Royal Marsden, she developed a total body irradiation protocol used to condition patients before transplantation. In 1979, with A. J. Barrett and R. L. Powles, she published the Royal Marsden's experience of total body irradiation and marrow transplantation for acute leukaemia. She later reviewed the technique across treatment centres and studied its late effects, calling for standardised recording of technique and delivered dose. Barrett also took part in collaborative UK studies of childhood cancer, including studies of local radiotherapy for stage I childhood Hodgkin's disease and prophylactic cranial irradiation in childhood acute lymphoblastic leukaemia.

Barrett published more than 150 academic papers and was an author, editor or contributor to several oncology textbooks. With Jane Dobbs, she produced Practical Radiotherapy Planning: Royal Marsden Hospital Practice, first published in 1985; a contemporary review in the British Journal of Radiology described it as a handbook of Royal Marsden radiotherapy practice of substantial value for trainees. She was also involved across several editions of Cancer in Children: Clinical Management, including the third edition in 1992 and fifth edition in 2005, and was later a co-editor of the Oxford Desk Reference: Oncology. She was one of the translators of Odile Schweisguth's Solid Tumors in Children, the English translation of Tumeurs solides de l'enfant.

Barrett was a Media Fellow of the British Association for the Advancement of Science in 1993, placed at The Independent, where she wrote and co-wrote science and medical news articles.

== Honours and awards ==
In 1985, Barrett was elected a member of the Royal College of Physicians of London under Bye-Law 117 (now Bye-Law 26.3), a provision allowing the college to admit candidates of distinction to membership without examination. She was elected a Fellow of the Royal College of Physicians and Surgeons of Glasgow in 1989 and of the Royal College of Physicians of London in 1991. In 1998, she was elected a founding Fellow of the Academy of Medical Sciences.

She received the President's Medal of the Royal College of Radiologists in 2005, and was appointed Officer of the Order of the British Empire in 2010 for services to medicine.

Her international honours included honorary membership of the American Society for Radiation Oncology in 2002, honorary fellowship of the American College of Radiology in 2006, honorary fellowship of the Faculty of Radiologists at the Royal College of Surgeons in Ireland in 2007, a lifetime achievement award from ESTRO in 2009, and ESTRO's Emmanuel van der Schueren Award in 2016.

== Later life and death ==
In retirement, Barrett held trustee and directorship roles in charitable, cultural and church organisations. She was a director of The Big C Appeal Limited, a Norwich cancer charity, from 2008 to 2012. The charity funded the Big C Centre at the Norfolk and Norwich University Hospital, a drop-in centre offering information and support services for people affected by cancer. She was also a trustee of Read Easy UK from 2014 to 2018, and a trustee and company director of Cobalt Health from 2015 to 2018.

From 2011 to 2020, Barrett was a trustee of the Association for Cultural Exchange, known as the ACE Foundation, at Stapleford Granary, Cambridge, serving as chair from 2015 to 2020 and later as honorary president from 2022. She chaired the trustees of the Parochial Church Council of St Paul's, Cambridge, from 2021 to 2022.

Barrett died on 18 March 2026, aged 83, of metastatic breast cancer.
