= Eftilagimod alpha =

Experimental cancer drug

Clinical data
- Trade names: ImmuFact
- Other names: Efti, IMP321

Legal status
- Legal status: Investigational

Identifiers
- CAS Number: 1800476-36-1
- UNII: SJ82PK3HWA

Eftilagimod alpha (INN; development code IMP321 or efti) is a large-molecule cancer drug being developed by the clinical-stage biotechnology company Immutep. Efti is a soluble version of the immune checkpoint molecule LAG-3. It is an APC Activator used to increase an immune response to tumors, and is administered by subcutaneous injection. Efti has three intended clinical settings:

- as adjuvant to cancer vaccines (in a low, effective dose of ~250 μg)
- as first-line 'chemo-immunotherapy,' that is, combined with standard chemotherapy (e.g. paclitaxel)
- in combination immunotherapy with PD-1 treatments (e.g. pembrolizumab)

Eftilagimod alpha is in Phase II clinical testing. Currently, the main indications for the drug are metastatic breast cancer, non-small cell lung cancer (NSCLC), and head and neck squamous cell carcinoma (HNSCC).

== Background ==
Eftilagimod alpha ("efti" in short) is a soluble LAG-3 fusion protein that activates antigen-presenting cells. It is a 160 kDa protein consisting of the four extracellular domains of LAG-3 fused to the Fc region of an IgG1(LAG-3Ig). Efti binds preferentially to a subset of MHC class II molecules that are enriched in lipid rafts and/or composed of stable peptide-MHC II (pMHCII) complexes. On T cells, membrane-anchored LAG-3 is an inhibitory receptor downregulating T-cell receptor (TCR) signaling. Efti – as a soluble LAG-3 protein – is an MHC class II agonist and therefore a dendritic-cell activator, causing increased antigen presentation to cytotoxic (CD8+) T cells. In the absence of antigen presentation via MHC class II molecules, efti reactivates dormant antigen-experienced memory T cells, allowing them to recognize their antigen targets at the tumor site.

== History ==
Soluble LAG-3 was first established as a dendritic-cell activator in the late 1990s. Frédéric Triebel, who discovered LAG-3 in 1990, worked through the 1990s at his laboratory at the Institut Gustave Roussy, in collaboration with INSERM and Merck Serono, to elucidate LAG-3’s role in the adaptive immune system. Triebel et al. had successfully produced a soluble LAG-3Ig fusion protein by 1995 and subsequently discovered its anti-cancer properties in vivo in different mouse tumor models in 1990. Shortly thereafter in 2001, Triebel formed a biotechnology company called Immutep SA in order to develop the therapeutic potential of LAG-3. Immutep was acquired by Prima BioMed in 2014 and as a result Eftilagimod alpha became Prima BioMed's lead compound. In 2017, Prima BioMed changed its name to Immutep to reflect its developmental focus on LAG-3 therapeutics.

== Clinical Trials ==
=== Ongoing Clinical Studies ===
As of February 2020, three clinical studies are ongoing:

==== Metastatic breast carcinoma (HER2^{−} HR^{+}) ====
In the AIPAC study efti is administered in combination with paclitaxel to women with HER2^{−} metastatic breast cancer whose disease progressed after endocrine therapy. This Phase IIb trial is a randomized, double-blind, placebo-controlled study aiming to enroll 241 patients. It had an open run-in phase with 15 patients being treated and the results were published at the 2018 ASCO annual meeting. The study is ongoing and is expected to show results in the first half of 2020.

==== Solid Tumors ====
The INSIGHT Phase I study is investigating the feasibility and safety of different routes of drug delivery (e.g. intra-tumoral, intra-peritoneal, and subcutaneous).

==== Non-small Cell Lung Cancer (NSCLC) and Head and Neck Squamous Cell Carcinoma (HNSCC) ====
In the TACTI-002 Phase II study, efti is administered in combination with pembrolizumab in three distinct and independent cancer indications (following a basket trial design):

1. First-line metastatic NSCLC
2. Second-line metastatic NSCLC in patients refractory to PD-L1 or PD-1 therapies such as pembrolizumab, nivolumab, avelumab)
3. Second-line HNSCC

In each of the three indications, a first cohort of patients is treated and only if a certain pre-determined number of tumor responses is reached may a second cohort of patients be enrolled. This follows the Simons two-stage design. At the 2019 SITC meeting, Immutep released interim results from their first-line metastatic NSCLC trial before announcing that stage 2 of the trial had officially commenced. In early 2020, Immutep also announced in a press release the continuation of their stage 2 trial in HNSCC.

=== Completed Clinical Trials ===
==== Phase I study in melanoma, 2016-2019 ====
The TACTI-mel Phase I study investigated the safety and potential synergies of efti in combination with the programmed cell death (PD-1) antibody pembrolizumab in unresectable or metastatic melanoma. The trial is noted as complete on clinicaltrials.gov; final results were published at the 2019 World Immunotherapy Congress in Basel, Switzerland. No major safety concerns and preliminary safety results were reported.

==== Phase I study in pancreatic cancer, 2009-2012 ====
In April 2009, Immutep announced its involvement in a Phase I study in pancreatic cancer conducted at Washington University School of Medicine in St. Louis, Missouri. This 18-patient study evaluated for safety the combination of efti with gemcitabine, a chemotherapy drug, at doses up to 2 mg. The combination was found to be safe, however no significant differences were observed when comparing pre- and post-treatment levels of monocytes, dendritic cells, and T cells, likely due to sub-optimal dosing. The results of the study were reported online in Investigational New Drugs in August 2012.

==== Phase IIa study in metastatic breast cancer, 2006-2010 ====
A 30-patient Phase IIa open-label study in HER2-negative metastatic breast cancer has suggested that efti works as a chemo-immunotherapeutic in breast cancer, whereby chemotherapy creates tumor debris (circulating tumor antigen), and efti increases activation of antigen-presenting cells (APCs) as they take up that debris. This trial arose in part from the findings of a June 2005 online paper in Cancer Letters by two researchers at the Centre René Huguenin in Saint-Cloud near Paris who had collaborated with Frédéric Triebel. This paper demonstrated that the level of serum soluble LAG-3 correlated with improved survival in breast cancer patients whose tumors were estrogen or progesterone receptor-positive. In the study, patients on weekly low-dose paclitaxel (chemotherapy) were administered ascending subcutaneous doses of efti on days 2 and 16 of a 28-day cycle of paclitaxel over six cycles. The maximum efti dose was 6.25 mg. Paclitaxel was given on days 1, 8, and 15, meaning that patients were administered efti the day after paclitaxel had killed some tumor cells leading to antigenic tumor debris to be processed by dendritic cells for antigen presentation to CD8+ T cells. There were two notable outcomes to this study:

- Response rate. At the six-month endpoint, 90% of patients had experienced a clinical benefit. The overall response rate was 50% based on RECIST criteria, which compared favorably with the 25% response rate observed in patients on paclitaxel monotherapy in the ECOG2100 study. The lead investigators of the chemo-immunotherapy combination trial also noted relevant differences in the two studies' patient groups: the ECOG2100 patients were on average younger than in the chemo-immunotherapy study, and a significantly lower percentage had disease in three or more sites upon entry into the trial.
- Increase in relevant cell numbers. There was a sustained increase in the number of monocytes, NK cells, and activated CD8+ T cells in the patients' blood samples when compared with baseline data, with the increase at the six-month mark having a statistical significance in each case. Also, the percentage of PBMCs represented by dendritic cells and terminally differentiated effector memory T cells increased, again with statistical significance.

The results of this study were reported in January 2010, and following an oral presentation at the ASCO Annual Meeting in June 2010 the results were published in July 2010 in the Journal of Translational Medicine. The study provided the basis of a new patent filing for Eftilagimod alpha.

==== Phase Ib study in renal cell carcinoma, 2005-2009 ====
Immutep's first Phase I study of efti in cancer patients was an open-label study in 21 metastatic renal cell carcinoma patients, with the drug being used as a monotherapy. These patients were known to be immunocompromised. The study, which began in late 2005, saw the patients administered ascending doses of efti (up to 30 mg per subcutaneous injection) fortnightly for six injections. The drug appeared to work at the two highest doses of 6 mg and 30 mg, with the primary outcomes among the eight patients who received these doses:

- Activated T cells. The eight patients experienced sustained CD8+ T-cell activation (as measured by percentage of CD8+ T cells expressing CD69, CD38, HLA-DR) that was statistically significant compared to the lower doses (p=0.016). There was a greater percentage of effector-memory CD8+ T cells (CD45RO^{hi}, CD45RA- and CD62L-), again, statistically significant compared to the lower doses (p=0.008). And there was an increase in the expression of co-stimulatory molecules CD27 and CD28 (CD27+CD28+, p=0.016; and CD27-CD28+, p=0.014).
- Stable disease. 7 of the 8 patients dosed at 6 mg had stable disease at 3 months compared with only 3 of 11 at lower doses. This results had statistical significance (p=0.015).

The results were published in Clinical Cancer Research in September 2009.

==== Early proof-of-concept studies, 2005-2007 ====
Immutep conducted two Phase I studies designed to evaluate the safety as well as immune response profile of efti in humans:

- A March 2007 paper published in the Journal of Immune Based Therapies and Vaccines showed that efti could increase T-cell response potentiation in healthy subjects being administered the hepatitis B surface antigen HBsAg. This randomized and controlled study, conducted in Paris in 2005 saw 40 healthy subjects immunized with 10 μg of HBsAg, and then given either saline (8 subjects) or ascending doses of efti up to 100 μg (32 subjects). An additional 8 subjects received a conventional Hepatitis B vaccine, the Engerix-B product of GlaxoSmithKline. Subjects administered efti had higher levels of HBsAg antibody in their blood as well as higher levels of antigen-specific T cells.
- An April 2007 online paper in Vaccine showed a similar T cell response potentiation, this time with 60 healthy subjects being administered Novartis' Agrippal influenza vaccine. This study, initiated in 2005 and completed in mid-2006, compared the influenza vaccine with the vaccine plus efti at doses up to 100 μg. For subjects that received efti there were higher levels of Th1-type CD4+ T cells in PBMC.

== Pre-clinical work, 2000-2008 ==
The years 2000 to 2008 saw a number of demonstrations of efti's effectiveness in vitro and in vivo:

- A June 2000 paper in the Journal of Immunology showed that efti (LAG-3Ig) could function as a vaccine adjuvant when immunizing mice with hepatitis B surface antigen and soluble ovalbumin.
- An April 2002 paper in the Journal of Immunology showed the mechanism of action of efti in inducing maturation and activation of human monocyte-derived dendritic cells, whereby efti binds to MHC class II molecules expressed in plasma membrane lipid rafts on immature dendritic cells and induces morphological changes such as the formation of dendritic projections, an up-regulation of co-stimulatory molecules, and the production of IL-12 and TNF-α.
- A February 2003 paper in Vaccine showed that, in human immature monocyte-derived dendritic cells, efti could induce the production of chemokines that would direct the migration of maturing dendritic cells to lymph nodes. Notably, LAG-3-matured dendritic cells were upregulated for CCR7. Later, the same authors showed that soluble LAG-3 could reduce the differentiation of macrophages and dendritic cells from monocytes, suggesting that the positive effect of LAG-3 as a dendritic cell-activator applied to pre-existing dendritic cells.
- A March 2003 paper in Cancer Research from scientists at the University of Turin, which included Triebel as a co-author, showed that, in mice, efti could potentiate a DNA vaccine targeting HER2 in a spontaneous breast cancer model.
- A March 2006 online paper in Vaccine showed, in animal models, that efti could immuno-potentiate therapeutic vaccines by inducing dendritic cell maturation.
- An April 2006 paper in Cancer Research showed, in vitro, showed that efti could induce an antigen-specific CD8+ T-cell response in human PBMCs – evidenced by the upregulation of T cells that displayed cytotoxic activity and produced Tc1 cytokines. The investigators for this work used influenza matrix protein antigen and the tumor antigens Melan-A/MART-1 and survivin to verify this CD8+ T cell response. They found that a LAG-3-related adjuvant effect depended on direct activation of antigen-presenting cells. For this paper Triebel collaborated with scientists at the Instituto Nazionale dei Tumori in Milan, Italy.
- A September 2007 paper in the Journal of Immunology, showed that efti could induce the activation of a large range of human effector T cells, resulting in the production of IFN-γ and TNF-α, among other cytokines. The investigators found that effector and effector-memory, but not naïve or central memory T cells, were induced by efti to a full Tc1 response. In their in vitro work with human blood samples the investigators found that efti bound all the circulating dendritic cells and a fraction of MHC class II+ monocytes. Significantly, 92% of samples responded at clinically meaningful levels to a first, short exposure of efti. The investigators contrasted the potency of efti with TLR1-9 agonists which, while inducing IL-10, are unable to induce a Tc1 IFN-γ response.
- A March 2008 paper in the Journal of Immunology, again in collaboration with the Instituto Nazionale dei Tumori, showed in vitro that efti could induce the maturation of monocyte-derived dendritic cells to produce chemokines and TNF-α, and that, when given with CD40/CD40L, it could induce full functional activation of dendritic cells so that they could produce heightened levels of IL-12. IL-12 is required for the induction of IFN-γ, which in turn is critical for the induction of Th1 cells.
- A June 2008 paper in Clinical Cancer Research demonstrated that efti at low doses could be used as a T cell adjuvant for cancer vaccines. For this work Triebel collaborated with Cell Genesys, a cancer vaccine company based in South San Francisco. Cell Genesys' lead product, GVAX, consisted of whole tumor cells genetically modified to secrete GM-CSF. When mice that had been inoculated with the B16 mouse melanoma cell line received both GVAX and 0.1 μg of soluble LAG-3, the result was a 7-day median survival advantage (47 to 54 days) over the mice which received only GVAX at day 3. Correlated with this survival data, the investigators noted higher levels of tumor-infiltrating lymphocytes for the combination group, and a higher number of antigen-specific CD8+ T cell responses. There was also a notable IgG1 humoral response.

== Potential use in a liver cancer vaccine ==
In May 2015, Immutep (Prima Biomed at the time) announced a collaboration with NEC Corporation and Yamaguchi University in Japan in which Yamaguchi researchers would be combining efti with a peptide vaccine they had developed as a potential therapeutic for hepatocellular carcinoma.

== Licensing in China ==
Immutep granted the rights to efti in mainland China, Hong Kong, Macao and Taiwan in October 2013 to Eddingpharm, a privately held Chinese pharmaceutical company.

== Manufacture ==
Efti is manufactured in CHO cells. Immutep worked with Henogen as the contracted manufacturing organization to provide efti for all trials until 2014. Immutep changed their contracted manufacturer to the Shangai-based WuXi PharmaTech, who began producing efti for all trials starting from 2016 onwards. 200-liter batches of efti are accepted for clinical trial use by multiple national agencies including FDA, PEI and MHRA. Recently, it was reported that upscaling to 2000-liter batches has initiated.
