= Immutep =

Biotechnology company

Immutep Ltd
- Company type: Public
- Traded as: Nasdaq: IMMP; ASX: IMM
- Industry: Biotechnology
- Founded: 2001
- Headquarters: Sydney, Australia; Leipzig, Germany
- Key people: Marc Voigt (CEO); Frédéric Triebel (Chief Scientific and Medical Officer)
- Products: IMP321, GSK2831781, CVac LAG-3 Immunotherapy
- Website: www.immutep.com

Immutep Ltd (formerly Prima Biomed) is a biotechnology company working primarily in the field of cancer immunotherapy using the LAG3 immune control mechanism. The company was originally built on CVac, a therapeutic cancer vaccine. In late 2014 the privately held French immunotherapy company Immutep SA was purchased by Prima Biotech.

Prima currently has three main products in its pipeline, all acquired with Immutep:

Eftilagimod alpha, (lab name: IMP321) which is recombinant soluble LAG-3, used as an activator of antigen presenting cells. This product has completed a Phase IIa clinical study, where it doubled the expected response rate in HER2-negative metastatic breast cancer.

IMP731, a depleting monoclonal antibody for autoimmune diseases, targeting LAG-3+ activated T cells. This antibody has been licensed to GlaxoSmithKline.

IMP701, an antagonist monoclonal antibody to LAG3 for use in cancer. This product has been licensed to Novartis.

== History ==
Immutep (formerly Prima BioMed) originated from four early-stage biomedical research projects which scientists at the Austin Research Institute, a medical research facility then associated with Melbourne's Austin Hospital (and that merged with the Burnet Institute in 2006) were working on in the late 1990s. These projects were packaged together and taken public in July 2001 on the ASX in a reverse takeover of a defunct mineral explorer called Prima Resources. The most advanced of these projects is what became CVac.

=== CVac ===
CVac was taken into the Phase II 'CAN-003' study in epithelial ovarian cancer in July 2010. In September 2013 Prima reported top-line interim data from this trial which showed no observed difference between treatment and control group in terms of progression-free survival (PFS); however, in May 2014, when Prima reported final data from CAN-003, it was able to show median PFS for CVac patients in second remission of 12.91 months versus 4.94 months for the control group. This result had statistical significance (p=0.04). After this data was received Prima sought to alter its clinical trial protocols in order to recruit second remission patients, however in February 2015 the company announced that it was no longer recruiting into its CVac studies. Prima reported final Overall Survival numbers for CVac in May 2015 showing that median survival number for second remission CVac patients had still not been reached at 42 months, versus the median for the treatment group of 25.5 months. The p value for this comparison was 0.07.

=== Immutep acquisition ===
Since February 2015 Prima's main focus has been on the programs that it acquired with Immutep. Prima had announced the acquisition of Immutep in October 2014 and completed the transaction in December 2014. The final purchase price was US$25 million. Immutep, which had been founded in 2001 by Professor Frédéric Triebel, had been built on LAG3, an immune checkpoint molecule known to play a role in switching off an immune response. Triebel had discovered LAG-3 in 1990 and over the course of the next decade, as part of a collaboration between Institut Gustave Roussy and Merck Serono, Triebel et al., established LAG-3's mechanism of action in T cells and dendritic cells. Immutep had called its soluble LAG-3 immune system activation technology 'ImmuFact' (short for 'Immunostimulatory Factors') and its LAG-3 antagonist antibody technology 'ImmuTune'. It also developed a technology platform called ImmuCcine which involved covalently linking an antigen to IMP321 in a fusion protein in order vectorise the antigen to dendritic cells. Currently Immutep are only focus on the ImmuFact and ImmuTune platforms.

== Eftilagimod alpha ==
Eftilagimod alpha (lab names: IMP321 or LAG-3Ig) is a soluble dimeric recombinant form of LAG-3, being a fusion protein with immunoglobulin, designed to activate antigen presenting cells. Immutep established in 2008 that the product could induce activation of dendritic cell and monocytes, resulting in T cell expansion. Phase IIa data in metastatic breast cancer, generated in 2010, has suggested that IMP321 works as a chemo-immunotherapeutic, where chemotherapy creates tumour debris, and IMP321 increases activation of APCs as they take up that debris. In that study, IMP321 increased the response rate according to the RECIST criteria from the 25% rate expected for paclitaxel to over 50% at the six-month mark. There is also evidence (in-vivo) that IMP321 at low doses can be used as a T cell adjuvant for cancer vaccines.

Immutep has initiated a Phase IIb study (2015–2019) of IMP321 in hormone receptor-positive metastatic breast cancer. As of February 2016 Prima has registered a Phase I study in conjunction with an existing approved checkpoint inhibitor pembrolizumab in late stage melanoma.

== IMP731 ==
IMP731 is a depleting antibody for autoimmune disease that targets LAG3+ activated T cells. GSK licensed the rights to develop such antibodies from Immutep in December 2010 in a total deal package worth £64m. GSK subsequently developed GSK2831781, its own depleting anti-LAG-3 antibody based on Immutep's original IMP731 antibody. Prima announced a 'single digit' million dollar milestone related to GSK2831781's commencement of a Phase I study in psoriasis in January 2015. There is evidence, in the tuberculin-induced DTH model in primates, that a single injection of a depleting LAG-3 monoclonal antibody can prevent Th1-driven skin inflammation.

== IMP701 ==
IMP701 is an anti-LAG-3 antibody which blocks LAG-3-mediated immune down-regulation. The product was originally licensed in 2012 to the American biotech company CoStim. That company was acquired by Novartis in 2014. Novartis remains a licensee of IMP701 but the program is pre-clinical.

== Prima stock ==
Prima has been publicly traded on the ASX since July 2001. The company did its IPO on Nasdaq in April 2012 and trades on that exchange in the form of ADRs. The current conversion rate between Prima ordinary shares and ADRs is 30:1. On 14 May 2015 Prima BioMed announced a A$15 million investment from Ridgeback Capital Investments, a US-based specialist healthcare investor. On 19 and 20 May 2015, just after Prima announced final Overall Survival data for its CAN-003 study of CVac, the company's ADRs experienced a significant two-day increase on Nasdaq. On 19 May the stock increased from US$0.52 per share from the previous session's close to US$1.60. On 20 May the stock opened at US$2.13 and rising as high as US$6.48 per share before closing at US$5.91. On that day 91.46 million ADRs were traded.

== Main people ==
Prima's CEO since July 2014 has been Marc Voigt, a German national who runs the company from its Berlin office. Frédéric Triebel serves as Chief Scientific and Medical Officer, working from the Paris office and laboratory. The Prima board is chaired by Australian-born scientist Russell Howard who took on the role in November 2017 following the resignation of Australian businesswoman Lucy Turnbull after seven years as chairperson.

== Locations ==
Prima BioMed has office space in Berlin on Brandenburgische Straße in the Wilmersdorf district near the Konstanzer Straße U-Bahn station. Immutep had laboratories and office space at Orsay, a southwestern suburb of Paris, and this has been maintained by Prima BioMed. There is also an office on Macquarie Street, Sydney.

== Leadership history ==
Prima BioMed's first two CEOs were Marcus Clark (2001–2006) and Eugene Kopp (2006–2008). In October 2007 the Sydney-based bioentrepreneur Martin Rogers became an executive director and he led the company as managing director or CEO through to 2012. An American named Matt Lehman was CEO to 2014 before he was replaced by the current incumbent, Marc Voigt.
