= APC Activator =

Type of immunotherapy

APC Activators (or Antigen-presenting cell activators) are a type of immunotherapy which leverages antigen-presenting cells (APCs) to drive an adaptive immune response. APC Activators are agonists to APC surface-expressed ligands that, when bound, induce the maturation and activation of APCs. Professional antigen-presenting cells – including dendritic cells, macrophages, and B cells – serve an indispensable role in the adaptive immune response through their unique ability to phagocytose, digest, and present exogenous (circulating) antigens to T cells, facilitating antigen-specific immune responses.

== Background ==
Professional APCs express MHC class II and CD40 molecules as surface receptors, and can be activated through direct interactions with T cells expressing these receptors' corresponding ligands, LAG-3 and CD40-L, respectively. A third class of receptors that can activate APCs are called toll-like receptors (TLRs); these receptors bind foreign ligands which are structurally conserved molecules from microbes, called pathogen-associated molecular patterns (PAMPs).

== Therapeutic potential ==
Combinatorial approaches that target multiple aspects of the cancer immunity cycle, including APC activation, are promising strategies for the treatment of diseases, including numerous types of cancer. Interest in the clinical use of TLR and CD40 agonistic antibodies in immuno-oncology wavered in the past decade. The APC Activator IMP321 (Eftilagimod alpha), a soluble LAG-3 fusion protein, is currently undergoing clinical trials in combination with chemotherapy (paclitaxel), or immune checkpoint inhibitors, including the PD-1 monoclonal antibody pembrolizumab, to accelerate the adaptive immune response in several tumor indications.
