= Martin Rogers =

Australian bioentrepreneur (born 1981)

Martin Rogers (born 1981) is an Australian bioentrepreneur who has been associated since 2007 with a number of ASX-listed biotechnology companies, including Prima BioMed, which he led from 2007 to 2012.

== Background ==
Rogers attended the University of New South Wales between 1999 and 2004 where he gained a double degree in chemical engineering and computer science. Between 2004 and 2007 he engaged in a number of entrepreneurial pursuits as well as worked at Macquarie Bank.

== Prima BioMed ==
Rogers was part of an investor group that effectively took control of Prima BioMed in late 2007, when he was appointed a director. At that time Prima had Phase IIa data for its CVac cancer vaccine product, but did not have the funds to progress further. Under Rogers' leadership Prima achievements included:

- Raised approx. A$82m in new capital: Rogers started with a 1-for-2 rights issue in October 2007 (A$2.0m) and followed with Share Purchase Plans in December 2008 and June 2009 (each approx A$0.2m) and a share placement in June 2009 (A$1.5m) before securing an equity funding line which allowed A$14.7m to be raised between July 2011 and March 2011. From late 2009 capital raising became easier. A third Share Purchase Plan in December 2009 raised A$13.7m while a placement and associated Share Purchase Plan in June 2011 raised A$41.4m. Between 2009 and 2012 the exercise of options brought in another A$8.4m (A$1.3m in 2009/10, A$5.1m in 2010/11 and A$2.0m in 2011/12).
- Experienced an increase in its share price: Prima stock re-rated 19-fold between December 2007 and April 2011, creating a company with a market value of ~A$300m.

Prima announced in May 2012 that Rogers would be stepping down as CEO. He left Prima at the end of August 2012. By the end of tenure Prima had made it into the S&P/ASX 300.

== Since Prima Biomed ==
Since 2012 Rogers has been involved at board level in a number of ASX-listed biotech companies, including Cellmid (ASX: CDY) between September 2012 and June 2015; Rhinomed (ASX: RNO), since September 2012; OncoSil Medical (ASX: OSL) since April 2013; and Actinogen (ASX: ACW), since September 2014.

In 2018, Martin Rogers, of KTM Ventures, co-invested with Mike Tilley to purchase a 30% stake in cryptocurrency exchange Independent Reserve.
