= LBD =

LBD may refer to:

== Arts and entertainment ==
- The Lizzie Bennet Diaries, a web series retelling of Pride and Prejudice
- LBD teen books by Grace Dent

== Education ==
- Learning by doing, a general concept of improving performance as the accumulated amount of work in some field increases
- Learning disability, frequently referred to as LBD (learning behavior disorder) by educators and workers in special education fields
- Literature-based discovery, a form of knowledge extraction and automated hypothesis generation

== Science and mathematics ==
- Lanczos bidiagonalization (Lanczos algorithm) in linear algebra
- Lewy body dementia, an umbrella term for dementia with Lewy bodies and Parkinson's disease dementia
- Ligand binding domain, in molecular biology, part of the structure of a nuclear receptor
- Literature-based discovery, a form of knowledge extraction and automated hypothesis generation

== Transport ==
- IATA airport code for Khudzhand Airport, Tajikistan
- MRT station abbreviation for Labrador Park MRT station, Singapore

== Weaponry ==
- LBD-1 Gargoyle, a surface-to-air missile
- Lanceur de balle de défense, French designation for flash-ball, a less-lethal law enforcement weapon

== Other uses ==
- Lafayette Brawlin' Dolls, a roller derby league in Indiana, United States
- Lesbian bed death, a concept proposed by sexologist Pepper Schwartz
- London Beth Din, a religious court of Ashkenazi Jews
- Little black dress, a semi-formal women's garment
