= Anne O'Tate =

Anne O'Tate is a free, web-based application that analyses sets of records identified on PubMed, the bibliographic database of articles from over 5,500 biomedical journals worldwide. While PubMed has its own wide range of search options to identify sets of records relevant to a researchers query it lacks the ability to analyse these sets of records further, a process for which the terms text mining and drill down have been used. Anne O'Tate is able to perform such analysis and can process sets of up to 25,000 PubMed records.

== Description ==
Once a set of articles has been identified using Anne O'Tate with its PubMed-like interface and search syntax, the set can be analysed and words and concepts mentioned in specific 'fields' (sections) of PubMed records can be displayed in order of frequency. 'Fields' which Anne O'Tate can display in this manner are:

=== Topics (MeSH) ===
This option may help to identify possible Medical Subject Headings (known as MeSH terms, but called 'Topics' by Anne O'Tate) for a subject for which no corresponding subject heading or 'entry term' (cross-references to preferred MeSH term) exists or where PubMed's automatic mapping process (identifying a MeSH term and including it in a search formulation) fails.

Searching for instance for articles on '"Knowledge Transfer"' (for which no corresponding MeSH or entry term exists) will retrieve a set of some 530 studies in PubMed (as of August 2011); Anne O'Tate's analysis suggests that MeSH terms like "Diffusion of Innovation" or "Information Dissemination" may be suitable additional concepts to retrieve a more 'sensitive' (comprehensive) set of references. This method of identifying possible MeSH terms is not available on PubMed.

=== Authors ===
This option may help with identifying authors who have written frequently about a given subject, or may help with identifying possible experts or peer reviewers

=== Journals ===
Identifying journals which publish papers on the subject under investigation may assist with selecting suitable journals to consider for manuscripts or for detailed scanning for relevant articles ('hand searching') not found by the search on PubMed.

=== Other fields ===
Author affiliations (addresses) and the years of publication can also be analysed. 'Important words' from titles and abstracts which may "[...] have more frequent occurrences in the result subset than in the MEDLINE as a whole, thus they distinguish the result subset from the rest of MEDLINE" can be identified and help with further refining a search on PubMed.

== History ==
Anne O'Tate (a pun on the word 'annotate') was developed by Neil R Smalheiser and a team of researchers from the University of Chicago. It is part of the Arrowsmith Project, which developed tools such as "Arrowsmith" proper, a text-comparison application, "Adam", a database of medical abbreviations, and Author-ity (an author-disambiguation tool), "Compendium", a list of biomedical text mining tools, and Anne O'Tate. The Project is based on research led by Don R. Swanson at the University of Chicago which hosted the original tool. Further research was led by Neil R. Smalheiser at the University of Illinois at Chicago, with funding from the National Institutes of Health.

== Other PubMed text-mining applications ==
A wide range of text-mining applications for PubMed have been developed, using their own interface, such as GoPubMed, ClusterMed, or PubReMiner. The application and performance of such tools can vary. Only Anne O'Tate uses PubMed's standard interface, search syntax, and some of its functionality.

== See also ==
- Biomedical text mining
- Medical Subject Headings
- MEDLINE
- PubMed
- Text mining
- GoPubMed
- Bibliographic database
