= GSK2831781 =

Monoclonal antibody for autoimmune diseases

Monoclonal antibody
- Type: ?

Legal status
- Legal status: Investigational

Identifiers
- CAS Number: 2088304-32-7

GSK2831781 is a monoclonal antibody being developed by GlaxoSmithKline (GSK) for autoimmune diseases. The antibody targets the T cell activation marker LAG-3, which is mainly expressed in inflamed tissues. In GSK's March 2015 Product development pipeline document the antibody is listed under 'Immuno-inflammation' candidates. GSK2831781 entered a Phase I clinical trial in psoriasis early in 2015.

== History ==
GSK2831781 originated from a chimeric monoclonal antibody to LAG-3 developed in 2008 by the French biotechnology company Immutep. That company had been built around drugs targeting LAG-3 and was associated with Frédéric Triebel, an immunologist generally regarded as a leading authority on LAG-3. In discovering the Immutep antibody, Triebel worked with two researchers from the University of Nantes, where there was an INSERM unit focused on transplantation immunology called ITUN (Institut de Transplantation Urologie Nephrologie). Triebel et al. codenamed their initial murine antibody A9H12, which became IMP731 after it had been chimerized with a human IgG1 Fc region in order to have antibody-dependent cellular cytotoxicity (ADCC) as well as complement-dependent cytotoxicity (CDC) properties.

GSK licensed the rights to develop anti-LAG-3 antibodies for autoimmune disease from Immutep in December 2010 in a total deal package worth £64 million. GSK subsequently developed GSK2831781, its own depleting anti-LAG-3 antibody based on IMP731, around 2013 or 2014. GSK's antibody was humanized and was afucosylated for higher ADCC.

Prima BioMed, the biotech company which acquired Immutep in 2014, announced a 'single digit' million dollar milestone related to GSK2831781's commencement of Phase I in January 2015.

== Mechanism of action ==
GSK2831781 works to treat autoimmune disease by targeting LAG-3+ activated T cells that are known to accumulate at the diseased organ site and destroying them through ADCC and CDC, thereby depleting them from the body. Because GSK2831781 is addressing the cause of the disease by depleting the few activated auto-aggressive T cells and not just the symptoms of the disease like inflammation (taken care of by current treatments like anti-TNF monoclonal antibodies or corticosteroids) it is thought to be part of the next wave of treatments in the field of autoimmune diseases.

== In vivo evidence ==
In December 2007 Triebel and his Nantes colleagues showed, in a paper in the journal Transplantation, that depleting anti-LAG-3 antibodies could stop alloreactive effector T cells from forming in rats that had had heart transplants.

In February 2011 the Nantes group and Triebel presented evidence, this time online in Clinical and Experimental Immunology (May 2011 in print), that a single injection of IMP731 can prevent, for many months, Th1-driven skin inflammation in the tuberculin-induced DTH model in primates. This evidence suggested to GSK the potential of psoriasis as an initial proof-of-concept indication for GSK2831781.

== Phase I, 2015 ==
GSK2831781's first clinical trial is a Phase I in both psoriasis patients and healthy individuals. The trial is expected to recruit around 63 subjects, half of whom will be healthy and half of whom will have plaque psoriasis. The healthy subjects will be given BCG in order to track DTH and subsequent response to antibody treatment. The study will be randomized, double blind, placebo-controlled, and single ascending dose. As well as evaluating safety and tolerability the study will investigate mechanisms of action and clinical endpoints. It is planned to complete by Feb 2018. The contract research organization working with GSK is PAREXEL, which will conduct the study at its site at Northwick Park Hospital in London. This trial started recruitment in early 2015.
