= The Green Journal =

The Green Journal, in informal usage, may refer to:

- Obstetrics & Gynecology (journal)
- Radiotherapy & Oncology (journal)
