= Favezelimab/pembrolizumab =

Combination of
- Favezelimab: Anti–LAG-3 monoclonal antibody
- Pembrolizumab: Anti-PD-1 monoclonal antibody

Legal status
- Legal status: Investigational

Favezelimab/pembrolizumab is a fixed-dose combination of two monoclonal antibodies developed by Merck to treat various cancers.
