= Adverse event prediction =

Adverse event (or Adverse effect) prediction is the process of identifying potential adverse events of an investigational drug before they actually occur in a clinical trial.

Predicting adverse events accurately represents a significant challenge to both the pharmaceutical industry and academia, the reason being that our existing knowledge of biology, disease mechanisms (i.e. how a disease affects the healthy state of a human) and drug design is incomplete and sometimes incorrect. On top of that, the biological complexity and differences between living organisms is such that even if a treatment appears to work in the laboratory it may not work in humans.

The occurrence of an adverse event during a clinical trial is a significant event, not only because of the risk to humans but also from a financial point of view for the organization (usually a pharmaceutical company) sponsoring the development of the drug in question. As a result, a lot of effort is continuously invested in this area and there are a number of approaches to predicting adverse events including cell line assays, animal models and computer based in silico models.

In silico models are usually developed by extracting interactions and behaviors of biological systems either from the literature or from experimental data on a specific disease or biological system and integrating this information in some kind of a mathematical model that can be used to understand and predict the behavior of a drug in an organism. Another relatively recent method is based on mining the scientific literature and correlating evidence from seemingly unrelated drugs or medical conditions. If done correctly this type of analysis can offer quite good predictive accuracy and significant lead times which translates to lower cost and development times for new drugs.

While in silico methods aim to capture in depth the current knowledge of a biological system or a disease mechanism, they are still subject to the accuracy of that knowledge and may miss information that while seemingly unrelated, could in a multiply interconnected complex biological system prove highly relevant. This gap is addressed by the literature-based discovery approach which does not capture details to the same extent but compensates by offering complete coverage of the available knowledge from all potentially related fields.

== See also ==
- Biovista
