= Arrowsmith System =

Arrowsmith was a literature-based discovery system built by Don R. Swanson using the concept of undiscovered public knowledge. He called it Arrowsmith: ‘An intellectual adventure’

"Imagine that the pieces of a puzzle are independently designed and created, and that, when retrieved and assembled, they then reveal a pattern – undesigned, unintended, and never before seen, yet a pattern that commands interest and invites interpretation. So it is, I claim, that independently created pieces of knowledge can harbor an unseen, unknown, and unintended pattern. And so it is that the world of recorded knowledge can yield genuinely new discoveries"

— Don R. Swanson, Swanson DR: "Undiscovered public knowledge." Library Quarterly, 1986, 56:103–118.

== Introduction ==
The tool has a search mode that assists the user in looking for items or concepts that may be present in common between two distinct sets of articles. Another context for using the search mode is when the user wants to find information that is present in one field that may be relevant to another field of inquiry. The user will be guided through two PubMed searches to retrieve bio-medical articles from the MEDLINE database: the first search defines "literature A" and the second defines "literature C." The program then generates a "B-list" of words and phrases found in the titles of both sets of literature.

The B-list is displayed ranked by relevance, and can be restricted to certain semantic categories (e.g. anatomical regions, or disorders, or drugs). For each B-term of interest, one can view the titles containing A and B ("AB titles") juxtaposed to the titles containing B and C ("BC titles"). In this manner, one can readily assess whether there appears to be a biologically significant commonality or relationship between the two sets of articles.

== History ==
Swanson was searching for MEDLINE databases when he found a thread about Raynaud's disease and dietary fish oil, which led him into wondering whether fish oil was of value in curing Raynaud's disease. This hypothesis was later proved to be true clinically. Then Swanson hypothesized a connection between migraine and magnesium deficiency, which was also clinically proved to exist.

Intrigued by these findings, Swanson and Neil Smalheiser of the University of Illinois at Chicago developed Arrowsmith, a piece of software for identifying connections between two Medline articles. Named after the 1925 Sinclair Lewis novel, it was aimed to build a systematic and computational method of finding possible links between articles.

== Impact ==
The Arrowsmith model proved influential, and the approach Swanson and Smalheiser developed has been adapted to study the correlations of genes with diseases and find possible new uses for medications.

== Related projects ==
- Author-ity: identify MEDLINE articles written by a particular individual
- Anne O'Tate: summarize, drill-down and browse the results of a PubMed query
- WETLAB: an open source electronic lab notebook
- ADAM: another database of abbreviations in MEDLINE

== See also ==
- Medical Subject Headings
