= Estro =

Estro or ESTRO may refer to:

- Estrogen, a human sex hormone
- European Society for Radiotherapy and Oncology
- Estro, a typeface designed by Aldo Novarese
- eSTRO, an e-sports team at the 2008 World e-Sports Masters
- -estro, a suffix in Esperanto vocabulary

== See also ==
- Saeco (cycling team), known as Saeco-Estro in 1997
