= Maurice Tubiana =

Maurice Tubiana (25 March 1920 – 24 September 2013) was a French radiologist, oncologist, and researcher renowned for his contributions to cancer treatment and radiobiology. He was a key figure in advancing radiotherapy and cancer research in France during the 20th century.

== Early life and education ==
Born in Constantine, French Algeria to a wealthy Jewish family, Tubiana joined the French Resistance during World War II. He obtained his medical degree in 1945 from the National Academy of Medicine and later earned a doctorate in physics in 1947. Tubiana studied biophysics at the University of California, Berkeley from 1948 to 1949.

== Career and research ==
Tubiana pioneered the use of the betatron in cancer therapy, working with Frédéric Joliot-Curie to develop this technology. He led the first team to use computers for cancer treatment planning, marking a significant advancement in oncology.

From 1959 to 1982, Tubiana served as head of the radiation department at the Gustave Roussy Institute in Villejuif. He later became the institute's director from 1982 to 1988. Concurrently, he held the position of professor of experimental and clinical radiotherapy at the National Academy of Medicine in Paris from 1963 to 1989.

Tubiana authored over 300 scientific publications and several influential books, including "Introduction to Radiobiology," which became a standard text in the field. He served as an expert consultant to the World Health Organization and the International Atomic Energy Agency, and co-founded the European Society of Therapeutic Radiology and Oncology, contributing to global health initiatives.

Beyond his research, Tubiana was a vocal advocate for public health. He championed anti-smoking campaigns and developed comprehensive public health plans addressing issues such as alcoholism and disease prevention. From 1990 to 1993, he served as President of the High Council for Nuclear Safety and Information.

== Recognition and awards ==
Tubiana's contributions were widely recognized. He was elected to the French Academy of Sciences in 1988 and received numerous awards, including the Gray Medal (1981), the Breur Medal (1985), and the Röntgen Prize (1986). In 1993, he was awarded the Grand Cross of the Legion of Honor, France's highest order of merit.
