= Artificial antigen-presenting cell =

Artificial antigen presenting cells (aAPCs) are engineered platforms designed to mimic the function of natural antigen-presenting cells (APCs) in stimulating T-cell responses. They are an emerging technology in cancer immunotherapy, which aims to harness the immune system to recognize and eliminate mutated cancer cells in a manner similar to how the body defends against viruses and other infectious agents.

Natural APCs act as sentinels of the immune system, patrolling the body for pathogens. When a pathogen is encountered, these cells activate T cells—often described as the "soldiers" of the immune system—by delivering specific stimulatory signals via cell surface molecules (epitopes). aAPCs replicate this process synthetically by attaching T-cell-activating signals to biocompatible surfaces, such as micron-sized beads or other macro- and microscale materials.

By imitating the antigen-presenting function of natural APCs, aAPCs allow for controlled activation and expansion of functional, pathogen- or tumor-specific T cells. These activated T cells can be studied in a biomimetic context and used for adoptive cell transfer therapies. aAPCs also offer potential advantages over natural APCs, including scalable production, lower cost, and enhanced experimental control.

== Essential components of an aAPC ==
=== Signal 1 ===
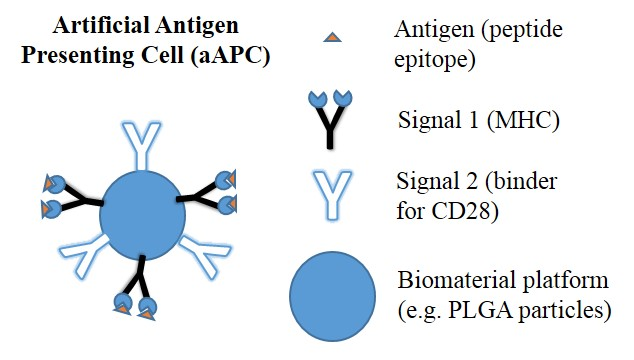
A general schematic of an artificial antigen presenting cell (aAPC). aAPCs are made by conjugating both T cell stimulatory Signals to material platforms.

Modeled after APCs, aAPCs need to have at least two signals to stimulate antigen specific T cells. The first signal is the major histocompatibility complex (MHC), which in humans is also called the human leukocyte antigen (HLA). This is the molecule which is loaded with the specific antigen. MHC class I are found on all cells and stimulate cytotoxic T cells (CD8 cells), and MHC class II are found on APCs and stimulate helper T cells (CD4 cells). It is the specific antigen or epitope that is loaded into the MHC determines the antigen-specificity. The peptide-loaded MHC engages with the cognate T cell receptor (TCR) found on the T cells.

=== Signal 2 ===
T cells need another signal to become activated in addition to Signal 1, this is done by co-stimulatory molecules such as the proteins CD80 (B7.1) or CD86 (B7.2), although other additional co-stimulation molecules have been identified. When Signal 2 is not expressed, but T cells receive Signal 1, the antigen-specific T cells become anergic and do not perform effector function.

=== Signal 3 ===
Signal 3 is the aAPC secretion of stimulatory cytokines such as IL-2 which enhances T cell stimulation, though this is not required for T cell activation.

== Types of aAPCs ==
Cell-based aAPCs have been produced by transfecting murine fibroblasts to express specific peptide-loaded HLA molecules with co-stimulatory signal B7.1, and cell adhesion molecules ICAM-1 and LFA-3.

Many microparticle systems have been developed as microparticles represent physiologically similar sizes to cells. Microparticle curvature and shape has also been shown to play an important role in effective T cell stimulation.

Nanoparticles have also been used. Nanoparticles have the additional advantage of enhanced transport once injected into the body as compared to microparticles. Nanoparticles are able to be transported through the porous extracellular matrix much easier and reach the lymph nodes where the T cells reside. Also, iron oxide nanoparticles have been used to take advantage of the superparamagnetic properties and to cluster both Signals to enhance T cell stimulation.

Materials which have been used include poly (glycolic acid), poly(lactic-co-glycolic acid), iron-oxide, liposomes, lipid bilayers, sepharose, polystyrene and Polyisocyanopeptides.

=== Lipid based aAPC ===
In natural systems, the dynamic lipid bilayer is crucial for molecular interactions. Lipid bilayer-based particles with a fluid membrane have been developed as aAPCs to replicate interactions between natural APCs and T cells in nature. For instance, it has been observed that in vitro CD4+ T cell activation by MHC-containing liposomes results in T cell proliferation and IL-2 release. It showed how the lipid membrane functions as a support structure for antigen presentation. Even in the absence of T cells, natural APCs have been found to precluster antigens. Researchers have created reconstituted liposomes with membrane microdomains enriched with epitope/MHC complexes to promote T cell proliferation. A higher level of T cell activation is induced by the preclustering of MHC molecules.

Researchers also used solid particles as a core for the lipid bilayer to increase the stability of the liposomes. These are known as supported lipid bilayers (SLBs). For example, nanoporous silica cores.

=== Polymeric aAPC ===
A variety of polymers have been added into aAPC systems, including biodegradable PLGA (Poly(lactic-co-glycolic acid)) and non-biodegradable sepharose or polystyrene beads. While IL-2 or other soluble molecules can be progressively released from within the aAPC, immunomodulatory substances (recognition and co-stimulatory ligands) can be attached to the surface of polymeric particles.

The size and shape of microbeads are important parameters for T cell activation. The optimal size is 4 to 5 μm and optimal shape is non-spherical or ellipsoid, like natural APCs, to increase the contact area of the particles with the T cells.

=== Inorganic aAPC ===
Superparamagnetic particles can be used as aAPC for ex-vivo T cell expansion. These particles can be covalently bound to stimulatory ligands. Another type of aAPCs are high-surface-are carbon nanotubes coated with ligands. These nanotubes showed higher T cell activation and IL-2 secretion than other high-surface-area particles.

== Uses ==
aAPCs remove the need to harvest patient specific APCs such as dendritic cells (DCs) and the process of activating the DCs in the stimulation of antigen-specific T cells. As specific cancer antigens have been discovered, these antigens can be loaded to aAPCs to successfully stimulate and expand tumor-specific cytotoxic T cells. These T cells can be then re-infused or adoptively transferred into the patient for effective cancer therapy. This technology is currently being tested within laboratories for potential use in cancer therapy and to study the mechanisms of endogenous APC signaling.
