= Biovista =

Pharmaceutical company based in Virginia, US

Biovista, Inc.
- Company type: Private
- Industry: Biotechnology
- Founded: 2005; 21 years ago Charlottesville
- Founder: Andreas Persidis
- Headquarters: Charlottesville, Virginia, US
- Area served: North America and Europe
- Key people: Aris Persidis (President); Andreas Persidis (CEO)
- Services: Drug repositioning
- Revenue: US$ 2.2 million (2010s)
- Number of employees: 8
- Website: www.biovista.com

Biovista Inc. is a private drug development services company based in Charlottesville, Virginia, US. Biovista's core business activities include drug repositioning and drug de-risking as well as disease cohort analysis, adverse event prediction and clinical hold analysis services. Biovista is also applying its technology platform to develop its own drug repositioning programs in the areas of central nervous system (CNS), diabetes/obesity, eye disorders, and oncology.

Biovista is an active participant of European Union co-funded R&D projects spanning areas such as post-genomic clinical trials research (ACGT project), mutant mouse models for the investigation of Human Immunological Disease (MUGEN project), semantic annotation and ontology driven text mining (PARMENIDES project) and systematic knowledge discovery (ESPERONTO Project).

== Technology ==
The company derisks and repositions drugs using multidimensional profiles of pharmacologically relevant entities such as genes, diseases, drugs, pathways and cell types, to identify and rank potential adverse events and new indications for drugs in development, on the market, or generics.

Biovista is also creating software-based tools and services for Reagent companies, researchers in the Life sciences and the consumer and patient health areas.

Biovista's technology platform is based on the analysis and integration of Biomedical information available in the scientific literature using Biomedical text mining techniques. Pharmacologically-relevant areas include drug toxicity, drug mode of action, disease mechanisms and biological system interactions. Biovista Inc.’s technology platform integrates literature-based discovery algorithms with Semantic search technologies to identify and rank potential solutions to a variety of drug development related problems such as predicting the adverse events of compounds, identifying suitable biomarkers for diseases and discovering new indications for existing drugs or drug combinations.

Biovista’s correlation engine scans potential interactions between pharmacologically relevant entities resulting in a correlation database. The database itself is based on a proprietary design that combines the Relational database management system (RDBMS) model with the Object-Oriented model allowing researchers to obtain preliminary answers in weeks rather than years.

In January 2010, Biovista announced that the U.S. Food and Drug Administration (FDA) has licensed its technology platform to help analyze, identify, and better understand the way certain drugs can cause harmful side effects. Since the beginning of 2009, Biovista has started its own drug development programs based on repositioned compounds in CNS diseases, such as Multiple sclerosis and Epilepsy.
