= Spondylometaphyseal dysplasia with cone-rod dystrophy =

Medical condition

- Other names: SMD-CRD (abbr.)
- Specialty: Medical genetics
- Symptoms: Affecting osseos system of the body
- Complications: Vision impairment
- Duration: Lifelong
- Causes: Genetic mutation
- Prevention: none
- Prognosis: Medium
- Frequency: rare, about 18 cases have been described in medical literature
- Deaths: -

Spondylometaphyseal dysplasia with cone-rod dystrophy is a rare genetic disorder characterized by spondylometaphyseal dysplasia (which consists of platyspondyly, tubular bone shortening, and progressive cupping of the metaphyses), neonatal growth delays, and cone-rod dystrophy-associated progressive vision loss. Only 18 patients from families in the United States, the United Kingdom, Japan, and Brazil have been described to date. This condition is caused by autosomal recessive mutations in the PCYT1A gene, located in chromosome 3.

Other symptoms include rib anomalies, astigmatism, abnormalities in color vision, severe hyperopia/myopia, hyperlordosis, nyctalopia, nystagmus, scoliosis, and photophobia.
