= Favezelimab =

Monoclonal antibody
- Type: ?

Clinical data
- Other names: MK-4280

Legal status
- Legal status: Investigational

Identifiers
- CAS Number: 2231068-83-8
- DrugBank: DB16729
- UNII: H1396W7D1H
- KEGG: D12469

Favezelimab (MK-4280) is an experimental anti-cancer monoclonal antibody developed by Merck. It is being tested by itself and in a fixed-dose combination with pembrolizumab.
