= Barbara Tudek =

Polish biologist (1952–2019)

Barbara Tudek (Polish pronunciation: [barˈba.ra tudɛk]; 1952 – March 1, 2019) was a Polish biologist who served as president of the Polish section of the European Environmental Mutagenesis and Genomics Society (EEMGS). In 2019, Tudek was a recipient of the Frits Sobels Award.

== Early life and education ==
Barbara Tudek was born in 1952. On April 27, 1983, she obtained a doctorate from the Medical University of Warsaw with the dissertation, Badania właściwości mutagennych ropy naftowej i rozpuszczalników stosowanych w przemyśle petrochemicznym jako ocena zagrożenia środowiska naturalnego człowieka ("Research on the mutagenic properties of crude oil and solvents used in the petrochemical industry as an assessment of the threat to the human environment"). Afterwards, she affiliated with Ludwig Institute for Cancer Research, Toronto, Canada, receiving a postdoctoral degree on June 5, 2001, on the basis of the dissertation entitled Utlenianie i alkilacja zasad DNA - rola pierwotnych i wtórnych uszkodzeń w replikacji i mutagenezie ("Oxidation and alkylation of DNA bases - the role of primary and secondary damage in replication and mutagenesis"). After this, she went to the Institut Gustave Roussy, Villejuif, France.

== Career ==
On June 8, 2006, she received the academic title of professor in biological sciences. She worked as a full professor at the Institute of Genetics and Biotechnology at the Faculty of Biology at the University of Warsaw and at the Institute of Biochemistry and Biophysics of the Polish Academy of Sciences. She was an active member of the EEMGS)for almost four decades and served as president of the Polish EEMGS section during the period 2002–12.

Tudek died March 1, 2019.

== Selected works ==
- 2000: Fapyadenine is a moderately efficient chain terminator for prokaryotic DNA polymerases
- 2005: Inhibition of DNA repair glycosylases by base analogs and tryptophan pyrolysate, Trp-P-1
- 2006: Sensory chemiczne i biosensory w kontroli żywności zmodyfikowanej genetycznie. Chemical sensors and biosensors for the control of GM food
- 2006: Modulation of oxidative DNA damage repair by the diet, inflammation and neoplastic transformation
- 2009: The effect of early life nutritional exposures on repair and DNA methylation in brain tissue from young piglets
- 2009: Cockayne syndrome group B protein is engaged in processing of DNA adducts of lipid peroxidation product trans-4-hydroxy-nonenal
- 2014: Zinc finger oxidation of Fpg/Nei DNA glycosylases by 2-thioxanthine: biochemical and X-ray structural characterzation
- 2016: Lipid peroxidation in face of DNA damage, DNA repair and other cellular processes

== Awards and honors ==
- 2019, Frits Sobels Award
