= Drug pipeline =

A drug pipeline is the set of drug candidates that an individual pharmaceutical company or the entire pharmaceutical industry collectively has under discovery or development at any given point in time. The drug pipeline is also sometimes restricted to a particular drug class or extended to mean the process of discovering drugs (the research and development pipeline). The R&D pipeline involves various phases that can broadly be grouped in 4 stages: discovery, pre-clinical, clinical trials and marketing (or post-approval). Pharmaceutical companies usually have a number of compounds in their pipelines at any given time.

The drug pipeline is an important indicator of the value and future prospects of a company. Usually the more compounds in the pipeline, and the more advanced stage that these are in the better. Other factors that are taken into account when assessing the value of a pipeline include the size of the target market of each drug, the market share that the drug is expected to capture and the risk that it will not be approved.

Some biotechnology companies, which are at or near the clinical stage and have attracted investors, are often bought by large pharmaceutical companies for high prices. However, these biotech companies may face failures, particularly in producing near-term products. This can lead to the shutdown of the acquired companies, resulting in the loss of accumulated knowledge and expertise. The cost of developing a new drug is astronomical – typically a drug costs many hundreds of millions and can reach 1 billion dollars over 15–17 years. Assessing this risk and filtering out, as early as possible, compounds that may not eventually get approved is essential to the pharmaceutical industry and involves checking the effectiveness of drugs as well as the likelihood of toxic events (Adverse event prediction).
