= Don R. Swanson =

American computer scientist (1924–2012)

- Born: Don R. Swanson; October 10, 1924
- Died: November 18, 2012 (aged 88)
- Education: University of California, Berkeley
- Known for: Literature-based discovery
- Awards: ASIST Award of Merit (2000)
- Scientific career
- Fields: Physics, bioinformatics
- Workplaces: University of Chicago

Don R. Swanson (October 10, 1924 – November 18, 2012) was an American information scientist, most known for his work in literature-based discovery in the biomedical domain. His particular method has been used as a model for further work, and is often referred to as Swanson linking. He was an investigator in the Arrowsmith System project, which seeks to determine meaningful links between Medline articles to identify previously undiscovered public knowledge. He had been professor emeritus of the University of Chicago since 1996, and remained active in a post-retirement appointment until his health began to decline in 2009.

== Life ==
Swanson was born in Los Angeles on October 10, 1924, the son of Harry Windfield and Grace Clara (Sandstrom) Swanson. He served with the United States Navy Reserve from 1943 to 1946, and received his B.S. in physics at Caltech, Pasadena, California in 1945. He gained his M.A from Rice Institute, Houston, Texas, two years later, and then a PhD in Theoretical Physics from the University of California at Berkeley in 1952.

From 1952 to 1954 Swanson worked as a computer systems analyst at Hughes Aircraft Company Research and Development Laboratories in Culver City, California. In 1955 had joined Ramo-Wooldridge Corporation. Initially working as a research scientist, by 1959 he was manager of the Synthetic Intelligence Dept. at Ramo-Wooldridge. There he led a project contracted to the Council on Library Resources, with Noam Chomsky and Paul L. Garvin as linguistic advisors, to investigate machine indexing of 'a small experimental library of scientific text (ca. 300,000 words)'. Swanson collaborated further with Garvin on Russian-English machine translation, considering problems of polysemy, in work funded by the Rome Air Development Center.

In December 1959 he attended the annual meeting of the American Anthropological Association, speaking on 'Engineering Aspects' in a symposium on the uses of data processing equipment in anthropology. By 1961 he was a member of the National Science Foundation's Science Information Council.

In 1963 Swanson joined the University of Chicago as a professor in the Graduate School of Library Science. He also served as dean of the graduate school from 1963 to 1972, from 1977 to 1979 and again from 1987 to 1989. From 1972 to 1976 he was a research fellow at the Chicago Institute for Psychoanalysis.

In the 1980s Swanson pioneered literature-based discovery in the biomedical domain, building the Arrowsmith System around a discovery method that has since become known as Swanson linking. He hypothesized that the combination of two separately published results indicating an A-B relationship and a B-C relationship are evidence of an unknown or unexplored A-C relationship. He used this to propose fish oil as a treatment for Raynaud syndrome, due to their shared relationship with blood viscosity.

From 1992 to 1996 Swanson was professor of the biosciences collection division and the humanities division at Chicago. In 1996 he became professor emeritus.

In 2000, Swanson was awarded the Award of Merit - Association for Information Science and Technology, the highest honor of the society, for his "lifetime achievements in research and scholarship."

== Works ==
- "Polarization Effects in 𝑛−𝑝 Scattering". Phys. Rev. 84: 1068. 1951. doi:10.1103/PhysRev.84.1068.2.
- "Interpretation of High Energy 𝑝−𝑝 Scattering". Phys. Rev. 89: 740. 1953. doi:10.1103/PhysRev.89.740.
- Swanson, Don R. (1953). "Polarization Effects in Nucleon-Nucleon Scattering". Phys. Rev. 89 (4): 749–752. Bibcode:1953PhRv...89..749S. doi:10.1103/PhysRev.89.749.
- Current Research and Development in Scientific Documentation No. 2 (Technical report). Ramo-Wooldridge Corp. 1958. pp. 31–32. NSF-58-20.
- H. P. Edmundson, ed. (1960). "The Nature of Multiple Meaning". Proceedings of the National Symposium on Machine Translation. Englewood Cliffs, N. J.: Prentice Hall.
- An experiment in automatic text searching, word correlation and automatic indexing, Phase 1, Final Rept (Technical report). Thompson Ramo Wooldridge Inc. 1960. Report C82-OU.
- Swanson, Don R. (October 21, 1960). "Searching Natural Language Text by Computer". Science. 132 (3434): 1099–1104. Bibcode:1960Sci...132.1099S. doi:10.1126/science.132.3434.1099. PMID 13774225.
- (with Paul L. Garvin and Jules Mersel) "Ramo-Wooldridge". Current Research and Development in Scientific Documentation. 8: 85. May 1961.
- "Information Retrieval: State-of-the-Art". Proceedings of the Western Joint Computer Conference 1961. Western Joint Computer Conference. Glendale, California. 1960.
- (with Christine Montgomery) Montgomery, Christine; Swanson, Don R. (October 1962). "Machinelike Indexing By People". American Documentation. 13 (4): 359–366. doi:10.1002/asi.5090130401.
- Cicely M. Popplewell, ed. (1963). "Interrogating a Computer in Natural Language". Information Processing 1962. Amsterdam: North-Holland Publishing Co. pp. 288–293.
- Paul L. Garvin, ed. (1963). "The Formulation of the Retrieval Problem". Natural Language and the Computer. New York.
- Swanson, Don R. (January 1965). "The Evidence Underlying the Cranfield Results". The Library Quarterly. 35: 1–20. doi:10.1086/619296.
- Joseph Spiegels; Donald E. Walker, eds. (1965). "On Indexing Depth and Retrieval Effectiveness". Second Congress on the Information System Sciences (Proceedings). Washington, D.C.: Spartan Books. pp. 311–319.
- "On Improving Communication Among Scientists". Bulletin of the Atomic Scientists. 22 (2): 8–12. 1966. Bibcode:1966BuAtS..22b...8S. doi:10.1080/00963402.1966.11454894.
- (ed. with Abraham Bookstein) Operations Research Implications for Libraries: Conference Proceedings. 1972.
- "On Force, Energy, Entropy, and the Assumptions of Metapsychology". Psychoanalysis and Contemporary Science. 5: 137–. 1976.
- "A Critique of Psychic Energy as an Explanatory Concept". Journal of the American Psychoanalytic Association. 25 (3). 1977. doi:10.1177/0003065177025003 (inactive 12 July 2025).
- Swanson, D. R. (1986). "New Horizons in Psychoanalysis: Treatment of Necrosistic Personality Disorders". Perspectives in Biology and Medicine. 29 (4): 493–498. doi:10.1353/pbm.1986.0006. PMID 3748769.
- Swanson, Don R. (1986). "Undiscovered public knowledge". Library Quarterly. 56 (2): 103–118. doi:10.1086/601720.
- Swanson, D. R. (1986). "Fish oil, Raynaud's syndrome, and undiscovered public knowledge". Perspectives in Biology and Medicine. 30 (1): 7–18. doi:10.1353/pbm.1986.0087. PMID 3797213.
- Swanson, Don R. (1987). "Two medical literatures that are logically but not bibliographically connected". Journal of the American Society for Information Science. 38 (4): 228–233. doi:10.1002/(SICI)1097-4571(198707)38:4<228::AID-ASI2>3.0.CO;2-G.
- Swanson, Don R. (1988). "Migraine and magnesium: Eleven neglected connections". Perspectives in Biology and Medicine. 31 (4): 526–557. doi:10.1353/pbm.1988.0009. PMID 3075738.
- Swanson, Don R. (1989). "Online search for logically-related noninteractive medical literature: A systematic trial-and-error strategy". Journal of the American Society for Information Science. 40 (5): 356–358. doi:10.1002/(SICI)1097-4571(198909)40:5<356::AID-ASI9>3.0.CO;2-B. PMID 10303918.
- Swanson, D. R. (1989). "A second example of mutually-isolated medical literatures related by implicit, unnoticed connections". Journal of the American Society for Information Science. 40 (6): 432–435. doi:10.1002/(SICI)1097-4571(198911)40:6<432::AID-ASI5>3.0.CO;2-#. PMID 10304056.
- Swanson, Don R. (1990). "Somatomedin C and arginine: Implicit connections between mutually-isolated literatures". Perspectives in Biology and Medicine. 33 (1990): 157–186. doi:10.1353/pbm.1990.0031. PMID 2406696.
- Swanson, D. R. (1990). "Medical literature as a potential source of new knowledge". Bulletin of the Medical Library Association. 78 (1): 29–37. PMC 225324. PMID 2403828.
- "Integrative mechanisms in the growth of knowledge: A legacy of Manfred Kochen". Information Processing & Management. 26 (1): 9–16. 1990. doi:10.1016/0306-4573(90)90005-M.
- C. L. Brogman, ed. (1990). "The absence of co-citation as a clue to undiscovered causal connections". Scholarly Communication and Bibliometrics. Newbury Park, CA.: Sage Publ. pp. 129–137.
- A. Bookstein, ed. (1991). "Complementary structures in disjoint science literatures". SIGIR91 Proceedings of the Fourteenth Annual International ACM/SIGIR Conference on Research and Development in Information Retrieval. Chicago, Oct. 13–16, 1991. New York: ACM. pp. 280–9.
- "Intervening in the life cycles of scientific knowledge". Library Trends. 41 (4): 606–631. 1993.
- (with Neil R. Smalheiser) "Undiscovered public knowledge: A ten-year update". Data Mining: Integration & Application (KDD-96 Proceedings, AAAI) (PDF). 1996. pp. 295–298.
- (with Neil R. Smalheiser) Swanson, Don R.; Smalheiser, Neil R. (1997). "An interactive system for finding complementary literatures: a stimulus to scientific discovery". Artificial Intelligence. 91 (2): 183–203. doi:10.1016/S0004-3702(97)00008-8.
- "Historical Note: Information Retrieval and the Future of an Illusion". Journal of the American Society for Information Science. 29 (2): 92–98. March 1998.
- (with Neil R. Smalheiser) "Implicit text linkages between Medline records: Using Arrowsmith as an aid to scientific discovery". Library Trends. 48 (1): 48–59. 1999.
- (with Neil R. Smalheiser and A. Bookstein) "Information discovery from complementary literatures: categorizing viruses as potential weapons". Journal of the American Society for Information Science and Technology. 52 (10): 797–812). 2001.
- (with Neil R. Smalheiser and Vetle I. Torvik) Swanson, Don R.; Smalheiser, Neil R.; Torvik, Vetle I. (2006). "Ranking indirect connections in literature-based discovery: The role of medical subject headings" (PDF). Journal of the American Society for Information Science and Technology. 57 (11): 1427–39. doi:10.1002/asi.20438. Archived from the original (PDF) on 2010-03-26.
