= Radiotherapy & Oncology (journal) =

Radiotherapy and Oncology
- Discipline: Radiation oncology
- Language: English
- Edited by: Pierre Blanchard

Publication details
- History: 1983–present
- Publisher: Elsevier on behalf of the European Society for Radiotherapy and Oncology
- Impact factor: 4.9 (2023)

Standard abbreviations
- ISO 4: Radiother. Oncol.

Indexing
- ISSN: 0167-8140

Links
- Journal homepage

Radiotherapy & Oncology is a peer-reviewed medical journal in the field of radiation oncology. Commonly referred to as "The Green Journal", it is published by Elsevier on behalf of the European Society for Radiotherapy and Oncology.

According to the Journal Citation Reports, the journal has a 2023 impact factor of 4.9.
