= CVac =

Immunotherapeutic agent that was 1st developed in Australia

CVac (short for Cancer Vaccine), is an immunotherapeutic agent that was 1st developed in Australia.

CVac was developed by the biotechnology company Prima BioMed (Nasdaq: PBMD) through to Phase II clinical studies between 2001 and 2015. After inconclusive clinical data in ovarian cancer 2013 and 2014, Prima announced in February 2015 that it had ceased recruiting into CVAc clinical studies and was seeking commercial partners for the product.

== Treatment method ==
CVac is an ex vivo dendritic cell priming technology involving MFP, or mannan fusion protein, where a fusion protein of MUC1 and Glutathione S-transferase is coupled to oxidized polymannose. The dendritic cells are the orchestrators of the immune system. 'Priming' dendritic cells involves exposing those cells to disease antigens in order to get the immune system to properly recognise the antigen and mount an appropriate response. With CVac this takes place outside the body of the patient (ex vivo), with dendritic cells obtained by leukapheresis. The antigen in this case is MUC1, known to be overexpressed on a variety of cancer cells and in CVac MUC1 is conjugated to the carbohydrate mannan to facilitate uptake by the dendritic cells. CVAc can be administered subcutaneously, whereas Provenge is intravenous.

== Early development in Melbourne ==
CVac originated in the mid-1990s at the Austin Research Institute, a medical research facility then associated with Melbourne's Austin Hospital (and that merged with the Burnet Institute in 2006). The original version of the product was developed in the laboratory of the Austin Professor Ian McKenzie in 1993. CVac therapy was originally intended to be in vivo but the Austin researchers started getting better results in ex vivo therapy.

== Development by Prima BioMed ==
Prima BioMed was formed around 2001 to commercialise a number of Austin Research Institute projects including CVac. The company was taken public in July 2001 on the ASX in a reverse takeover of a defunct mineral explorer called Prima Resources. CVac ultimately ended up as Prima BioMed's core project until Prima's acquisition of the French biotechnology company Immutep SA in 2014.

== Dubai Approval ==
CVac was approved for use by the Dubai Health City Authority in May 2011.

== Manufacturing ==
CVac was manufactured in Germany by Fraunhofer IZI (Das Fraunhofer-Institut für Zelltherapie und Immunologie), an institute of the Fraunhofer Society in Leipzig, Saxony The Fraunhofer IZI was authorized to manufacture the treatment in Europe in late 2011 after meeting criteria laid down by the German Arzneimittelgesetz (Drug Law). Prima intended that its product would be manufactured at this one central location, with patient blood being flown to Leipzig and primed dendritic cells being shipped back to the relevant trial site.
