= GVAX =

GVAX is a cancer vaccine composed of whole tumor cells genetically modified to secrete the immune stimulatory cytokine, granulocyte-macrophage colony-stimulating factor (GM-CSF), and then irradiated to prevent further cell division. The product exists as both autologous (patient specific) and allogeneic (non-patient specific) therapy.

== History ==
GVAX was developed around 1993 by Glenn Dranoff, a cancer researcher then at the Whitehead Institute in Cambridge, Massachusetts. The therapy was initially developed by a public gene therapy company called Somatix, which was acquired in 1997 by Cell Genesys. That company took the vaccine into Phase III trials in 2004 however these trials were halted in 2008 due to an apparent lack of efficacy. Cell Genesys continued development, however in August 2009, due to funding difficulties, the company announced that it was merging with BioSante Pharmaceuticals. In 2013 BioSante sold the GVAx program to Aduro Biotech, a company based in Berkeley, California. In 2020 Aduro Biotech merged with Chinook Therapeutics, Inc. to form Chinook Therapeutics.

== Current development ==
Aduro Biotech is currently in Phase II with GVAX in pancreatic cancer, where the company is also trialing a combination of GVAX with a PD-1 inhibitor.
