= GoPubMed =

GoPubMed was a knowledge-based search engine for biomedical texts. The Gene Ontology (GO) and Medical Subject Headings (MeSH) served as "Table of contents" in order to structure the millions of articles in the MEDLINE database. MeshPubMed was at one point a separate project, but the two were merged.

The technologies used in GoPubMed were generic and could in general be applied to any kind of texts and any kind of knowledge bases. The system was developed at the Technische Universität Dresden by Michael Schroeder and his team at Transinsight.

GoPubMed was recognized with the 2009 red dot: best of the best award in the category communication design – graphical user interfaces and interactive tool. Transinsight was recognized with the German Innovation Prize IT for its developments in Enterprise Semantic Intelligence at CeBIT 2011.
