= PCYT1A =

Protein-coding gene in the species Homo sapiens

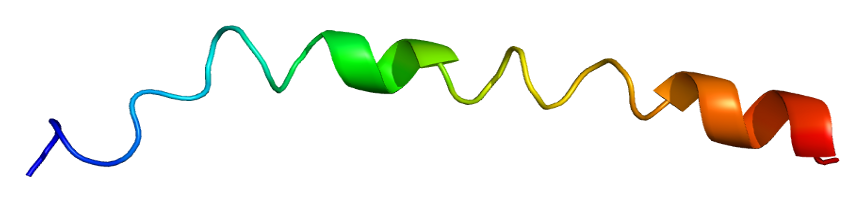

Identifiers
- Aliases: PCYT1A, CCTA, CT, CTA, CTPCT, PCYT1, SMDCRD, phosphate cytidylyltransferase 1, choline, alpha, phosphate cytidylyltransferase 1A, choline, CCTalpha
- External IDs: OMIM: 123695; MGI: 88557; GeneCards: PCYT1A
Enzyme activity
EC #	BRENDA	ExPASy	KEGG	MetaCyc
2.7.7.15	↗	↗	↗	↗

Gene location (Human)
Chr.	Chromosome 3 (human)
Band	3q29	Start	196,214,222 bp
Band	3q29	End	196,287,957 bp

Gene location (Mouse)
Chr.	Chromosome 16 (mouse)
Band	16 B3|16 22.69 cM	Start	32,249,739 bp
Band	16 B3|16 22.69 cM	End	32,293,888 bp
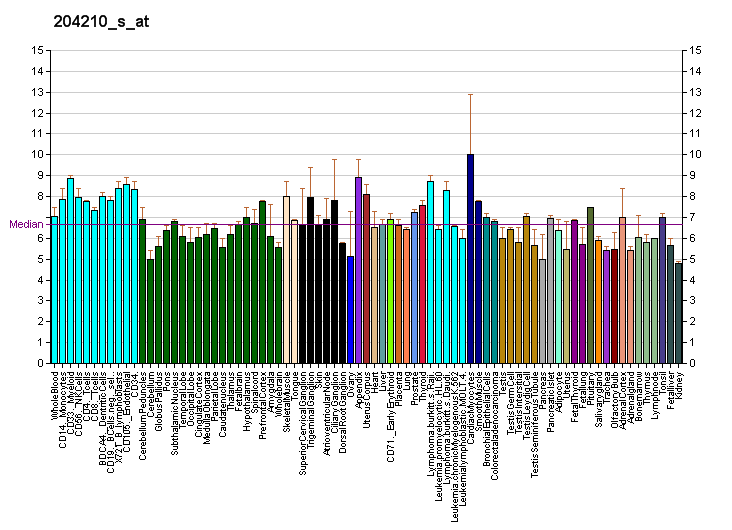

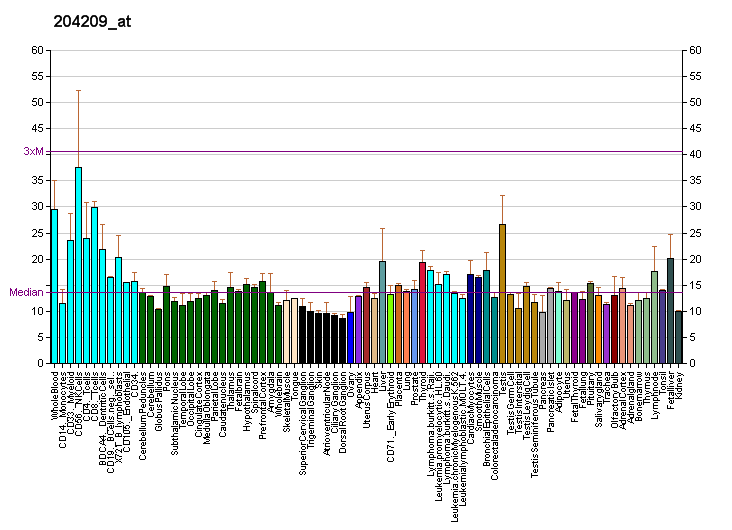
RNA expression pattern
Bgee	Human / Mouse (ortholog); Top expressed in: sural nerve; monocyte; skin of leg; skin of abdomen; tendon of biceps brachii; duodenum; granulocyte; Skeletal muscle tissue of rectus abdominis; blood; gingival epithelium / Top expressed in: muscle of thigh; triceps brachii muscle; temporal muscle; epithelium of stomach; extensor digitorum longus muscle; digastric muscle; sternocleidomastoid muscle; plantaris muscle; jejunum; duodenum; More reference expression data
BioGPS	More reference expression data
Gene ontology
Molecular function	transferase activity; nucleotidyltransferase activity; catalytic activity; protein homodimerization activity; lipid binding; choline-phosphate cytidylyltransferase activity; calmodulin binding; phosphatidylcholine binding
Cellular component	cytoplasm; cytosol; membrane; endoplasmic reticulum membrane; glycogen granule; nuclear envelope; endoplasmic reticulum; plasma membrane
Biological process	biosynthetic process; lipid metabolism; phospholipid biosynthetic process; phosphatidylcholine biosynthetic process; CDP-choline pathway
Sources:Amigo / QuickGO
Orthologs
Databases	NCBI: entry; OMA: entry
Species	Human	Mouse
Entrez	5130	13026
Ensembl	ENSG00000161217	ENSMUSG00000005615
UniProt	P49585	P49586
RefSeq (mRNA)	NM_005017; NM_001312673	NM_001163159; NM_001163160; NM_009981
RefSeq (protein)	NP_001299602; NP_005008	NP_001156631; NP_001156632; NP_034111
Location (UCSC)	Chr 3: 196.21 – 196.29 Mb	Chr 16: 32.25 – 32.29 Mb
PubMed search
- Wikidata
View/Edit Human	View/Edit Mouse

Choline-phosphate cytidylyltransferase A is an enzyme that in humans is encoded by the PCYT1A gene. Mutations in the gene are associated with spondylometaphyseal dysplasia with cone-rod dystrophy.

== See also ==
Choline-phosphate cytidylyltransferase
