= Antigen-presenting cell =

Cell that displays antigen bound by MHC proteins on its surface

Antigen presentation stimulates immature T cells to become either mature "cytotoxic" CD8+ cells or mature "helper" CD4+ cells.

An antigen-presenting cell (APC) or accessory cell is a cell that displays an antigen bound by major histocompatibility complex (MHC) proteins on its surface; this process is known as antigen presentation. T cells may recognize these complexes using their T cell receptors (TCRs). APCs process antigens and present them to T cells.

Almost all cell types can present antigens in some way. They are found in a variety of tissue types. Dedicated antigen-presenting cells, including macrophages, B cells and dendritic cells, present foreign antigens to helper T cells, while virus-infected cells (or cancer cells) can present antigens originating inside the cell to cytotoxic T cells. In addition to the MHC family of proteins, antigen presentation relies on other specialized signaling molecules on the surfaces of both APCs and T cells.

Antigen-presenting cells are vital for effective adaptive immune response, as the functioning of both cytotoxic and helper T cells is dependent on APCs. Antigen presentation allows for specificity of adaptive immunity and can contribute to immune responses against both intracellular and extracellular pathogens. It is also involved in defense against tumors. Some cancer therapies involve the creation of artificial APCs to prime the adaptive immune system to target malignant cells.

== Types and functions ==
Antigen-presenting cells fall into two categories: professional and non-professional. Those that express MHC class II molecules along with co-stimulatory molecules and pattern recognition receptors are often called professional antigen-presenting cells. The non-professional APCs express MHC class I molecules.

T cells must be activated before they can divide and perform their function. This is achieved by interacting with a professional APC which presents an antigen recognized by their T cell receptor. The APC involved in activating T cells is usually a dendritic cell. T cells cannot recognize (and therefore cannot respond to) "free" or soluble antigens. They can only recognize and respond to antigen that has been processed and presented by cells via carrier molecules like MHC molecules. Helper T cells can recognize exogenous antigen presented on MHC class II; cytotoxic T cells can recognize endogenous antigen presented on MHC class I. Most cells in the body can present antigen to CD8+ cytotoxic T cells via MHC class I; however, the term "antigen-presenting cell" is often used specifically to describe professional APCs. Such cells express MHC class I and MHC class II molecules and can stimulate CD4^{+} helper T cells as well as cytotoxic T cells.

APCs can also present foreign and self lipids to T cells and natural killer cells by using the CD1 family of proteins, which are structurally similar to the MHC class I family.

=== Professional APCs ===
Professional APCs describe those APCs which are capable of delivering all 3 signals needed to activate a naive T cell (signal 1- the antigen itself, the peptide-MHC complex; signal 2 - costimulatory ligand; signal 3- cytokines to guide polarization of the T cell). Canonically, the 3 pAPC types are dendritic cells, macrophages, and B cells. They are very efficient at internalizing antigens, either by phagocytosis (e.g. macrophages), or by receptor-mediated endocytosis (B cells), processing the antigen into peptide fragments and then displaying those peptides (bound to a class II MHC molecule) on their membrane. The T cell recognizes and interacts with the antigen-class II MHC molecule complex on the membrane of the antigen-presenting cell. An additional co-stimulatory signal is then produced by the antigen-presenting cell, leading to activation of the T cell. The expression of co-stimulatory molecules and MHC class II are defining features of professional APCs. All professional APCs also express MHC class I molecules as well.

The main types of professional antigen-presenting cells are dendritic cells, macrophages and B cells.

==== Dendritic cells (DCs) ====
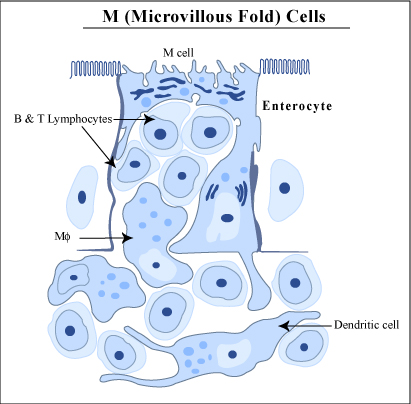
M Cells: Enterocyte, Dendritic cell.

Dendritic cells have the broadest range of antigen presentation and are necessary for activation of naive T cells. DCs present antigen to both helper and cytotoxic T cells. They can also perform cross-presentation, a process by which they present exogenous antigen on MHC class I molecules to cytotoxic T cells. Cross-presentation allows for the activation of these T cells. Dendritic cells also play a role in peripheral tolerance, which contributes to prevention of auto-immune disease.

Prior to encountering foreign antigen, dendritic cells express very low levels of MHC class II and co-stimulatory molecules on their cell surface. These immature dendritic cells are ineffective at presenting antigen to T helper cells. Once a dendritic cell's pattern-recognition receptors recognize a pathogen-associated molecular pattern, antigen is phagocytosed and the dendritic cell becomes activated, upregulating the expression of MHC class II molecules. It also upregulates several co-stimulatory molecules required for T cell activation, including CD40 and B7. The latter can interact with CD28 on the surface of a CD4^{+} T cell. The dendritic cell is then a fully mature professional APC. It moves from the tissue to lymph nodes, where it encounters and activates T cells.

==== Macrophages ====
Macrophages can be stimulated by T cell secretion of interferon. After this activation, macrophages are able to express MHC class II and co-stimulatory molecules, including the B7 complex and can present phagocytosed peptide fragments to helper T cells. Activation can assist pathogen-infected macrophages in clearing the infection. Deriving from monocytes, a type of white blood cell, they will circulate in the blood and enter affected sites and differentiate from monocytes to macrophages. At the affected site, the macrophage surrounds the site of infection or tissue damage with its membrane in a mechanism called phagocytosis.

==== B cells ====
B cells can internalize antigen that binds to their B cell receptor and present it to helper T cells. Unlike T cells, B cells can recognize soluble antigen for which their B cell receptor is specific. They can then process the antigen and present peptides using MHC class II molecules. When a T helper cell with a TCR specific for that peptide binds, the B cell marker CD40 binds to CD40L on the T cell surface. When activated by a T cell, a B cell can undergo antibody isotype switching, affinity maturation, as well as formation of memory cells.

=== Non-professional APCs ===
Non-professional antigen presenting cells include all nucleated cell types in the body. They use an MHC class I molecule coupled to beta-2 microglobulin to display endogenous peptides on the cell membrane. These peptides originate within the cell itself, in contrast to the exogenous antigen displayed by professional APCs using MHC class II molecules. Cytotoxic T cells are able to interact with endogenous antigen presented using an MHC class I molecule. Non-professional APCs do not typically express MHC class II molecules. However, it has been observed that antigen presentation to CD4^{+} cells via MHC class II is not restricted to the classically professional APCs. Other leukocytes, including granulocytes such as mast cells and neutrophils, can be induced to do so, as can endothelial and epithelial cells under certain circumstances. Even so, there is little evidence that these atypical APCs are able to activate naive CD4^{+} T cells.

== Interaction with T cells ==
After dendritic cells have phagocytosed pathogens, they usually migrate to the vast network of lymph vessels and are carried by lymph flow to the draining lymph nodes. Each lymph node is a collection point where APCs can interact with T cells. During the migration, DCs undergo a process of maturation: they lose most of their ability to further engulf pathogens and they mature by changing surface expression of MHC and co-stimulatory molecules, as well as increased production of cytokines. The internalized antigen is digested into smaller peptides containing epitopes, which are then presented to T cells by the MHC.

B cells reside in the lymph node. Once their B cell receptor binds to an antigen, they can interact with activated helper T cells, as described above.

A dendritic cell that interacts with an already-activated helper T cell can become licensed. This occurs through the interaction of co-stimulatory molecules including B7 and CD40 on the dendritic cell, with CD28 and CD40 ligand on the T cell. Only licensed dendritic cells are able to activate cytotoxic T cells. T cell licensing of dendritic cells is key for activation of cytotoxic T cells for many pathogens, although the extent to which T cell help is needed may vary.

In MHC class I and class II molecules, only certain epitopes of an internalized peptide can be presented. These epitopes are termed immunodominant.

== In cancer therapy ==
APCs naturally have a role in fighting tumors, via stimulation of B and cytotoxic T cells to respectively produce antibodies against tumor-related antigen and kill malignant cells. Dendritic cells, presenting tumor-specific antigen to T cells, are key to this process. Cancer therapies have included treating the patient with increased numbers of dendritic cells or cancer-specific T cells. However, newer therapies have turned to genetically engineered artificial antigen-presenting cells designed to prime the immune system to attack malignant cells. Some artificial APCs are derived from human cells; others are acellular, containing MHC proteins, co-stimulatory molecules and the necessary peptides.

The APC activator IMP321 is being tested in clinical trials to accelerate the immune reaction to eliminate metastatic breast cancer or melanoma.
