= Cobalt Health =

British medical charity

- Founded: 1964
- Type: Charitable organisation
- Registration no.: 1090790
- Purpose: Medical diagnostic imaging
- Location: Linton House, Thirlestaine Road, Cheltenham, Glos GL53 7AS
- Region served: United Kingdom
- Product: Medical diagnostic imaging MRI, PET/CT, CT, Cone Beam CT, Digital X-ray, Ultrasound
- Key people: Malcolm MacKeith
- Employees: 150
- Volunteers: 100
- Website: www.cobalthealth.co.uk
- Formerly called: Cobalt Unit Appeal Fund

Cobalt Health is an independent medical charity established in 1964 to help people affected by cancer, dementia and other conditions. They provide diagnostic imaging for over 130,000 patients annually at imaging centres in Cheltenham and Birmingham, England, and through a fleet of mobile MRI, CT Scan and PET-CT scanners for NHS hospitals and other medical facilities across the UK.

The charity's vision statement is "The best healthcare outcomes for all through world-class medical imaging" and its mission statement is "To enable timely, accurate diagnosis and treatment through sustainable innovation in imaging."

The charity is regulated by the Care Quality Commission and meets the standards set by the Quality Standard for Imaging. It is also accredited with ISO 9001:2015 quality and ISO 14001 environmental management standard.
