= European Society for Radiotherapy and Oncology =

European scientific society

ESTRO (The European Society for Radiotherapy and Oncology) is a scientific society established in 1980 in Milan, Italy, founded by Maurice Tubiana, Jerzy Einhorn, Klaas Breur, Michael Peckham, and Emmanuel van der Schueren. It aims to advance radiation oncology to improve cancer treatment outcomes through education, research, and quality assurance. ESTRO is based in Brussels, Belgium. It is governed by an elected Board and has several councils focused on areas such as education, science, and professional clinical practice. The society collaborates with other oncology organizations and works to promote radiation oncology at the European level.

== Main Activities ==
ESTRO supports its members through various initiatives:

- Education: The ESTRO School offers a wide range of courses and workshops covering all aspects of radiation oncology.
- Conferences: Annual ESTRO congresses and specialized meetings provide platforms for scientific exchange.
- Publications: "Radiotherapy & Oncology" is a peer-reviewed medical journal published by Elsevier on behalf of ESTRO, also known as "The Green Journal", to disseminate research findings.
- Policy and Advocacy: ESTRO engages in public affairs activities to advocate for the importance of radiation oncology in cancer treatment. It publishes policy reviews and consensus statements in well-known journals.
