= Lymphocyte-activation gene 3 =

Protein-coding gene in the species Homo sapiens

LAG3

Identifiers
- Aliases: LAG3, CD223, lymphocyte activating 3
- External IDs: OMIM: 153337; MGI: 106588; GeneCards: LAG3

Gene location (Human)
Chr.	Chromosome 12 (human)
Band	12p13.31	Start	6,772,512 bp
Band	12p13.31	End	6,778,455 bp

Gene location (Mouse)
Chr.	Chromosome 6 (mouse)
Band	6|6 F2	Start	124,881,324 bp
Band	6|6 F2	End	124,888,668 bp
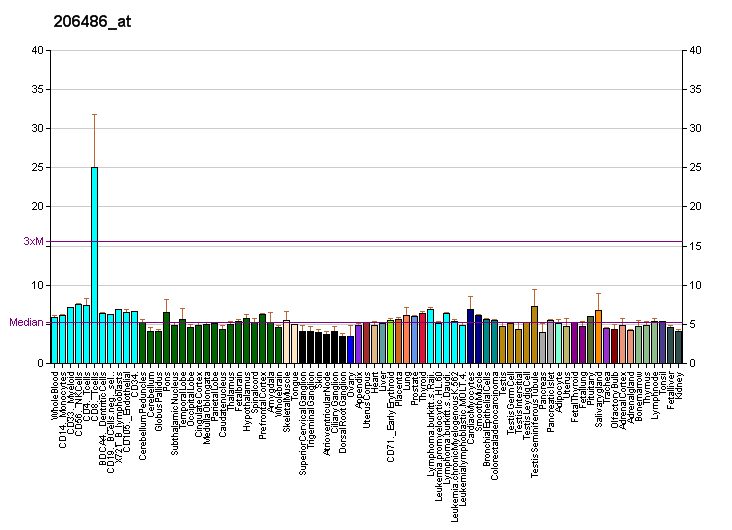
RNA expression pattern
Bgee	Human / Mouse (ortholog); Top expressed in: granulocyte; right ovary; left ovary; gonad; spleen; testicle; right lobe of liver; body of uterus; left uterine tube; lymph node / Top expressed in: embryo; embryo; thymus; zygote; lip; superior frontal gyrus; epiblast; granulocyte; primary visual cortex; ventricular zone; More reference expression data
BioGPS	More reference expression data
Gene ontology
Molecular function	antigen binding; transmembrane signaling receptor activity; MHC class II protein binding
Cellular component	membrane; external side of plasma membrane; integral component of membrane; plasma membrane
Biological process	negative regulation of T cell activation; cell surface receptor signaling pathway; positive regulation of natural killer cell mediated cytotoxicity; antigen processing and presentation of exogenous peptide antigen via MHC class II
Sources:Amigo / QuickGO
Orthologs
Databases	NCBI: entry; OMA: entry
Species	Human	Mouse
Entrez	3902	16768
Ensembl	ENSG00000089692	ENSMUSG00000030124
UniProt	P18627	Q61790
RefSeq (mRNA)	NM_002286	NM_008479
RefSeq (protein)	NP_002277	NP_032505
Location (UCSC)	Chr 12: 6.77 – 6.78 Mb	Chr 6: 124.88 – 124.89 Mb
PubMed search
- Wikidata
View/Edit Human	View/Edit Mouse

Lymphocyte-activation gene 3, also known as LAG-3, is a protein which in humans is encoded by the LAG3 gene. LAG3, which was discovered in 1990 and was designated CD223 (cluster of differentiation 223) after the Seventh Human Leucocyte Differentiation Antigen Workshop in 2000, is a cell surface molecule with diverse biological effects on T cell function but overall has an immune inhibitory effect. It is an immune checkpoint receptor and as such is the target of various drug development programs by pharmaceutical companies seeking to develop new treatments for cancer and autoimmune disorders. In soluble form it is also being developed as a cancer drug in its own right.

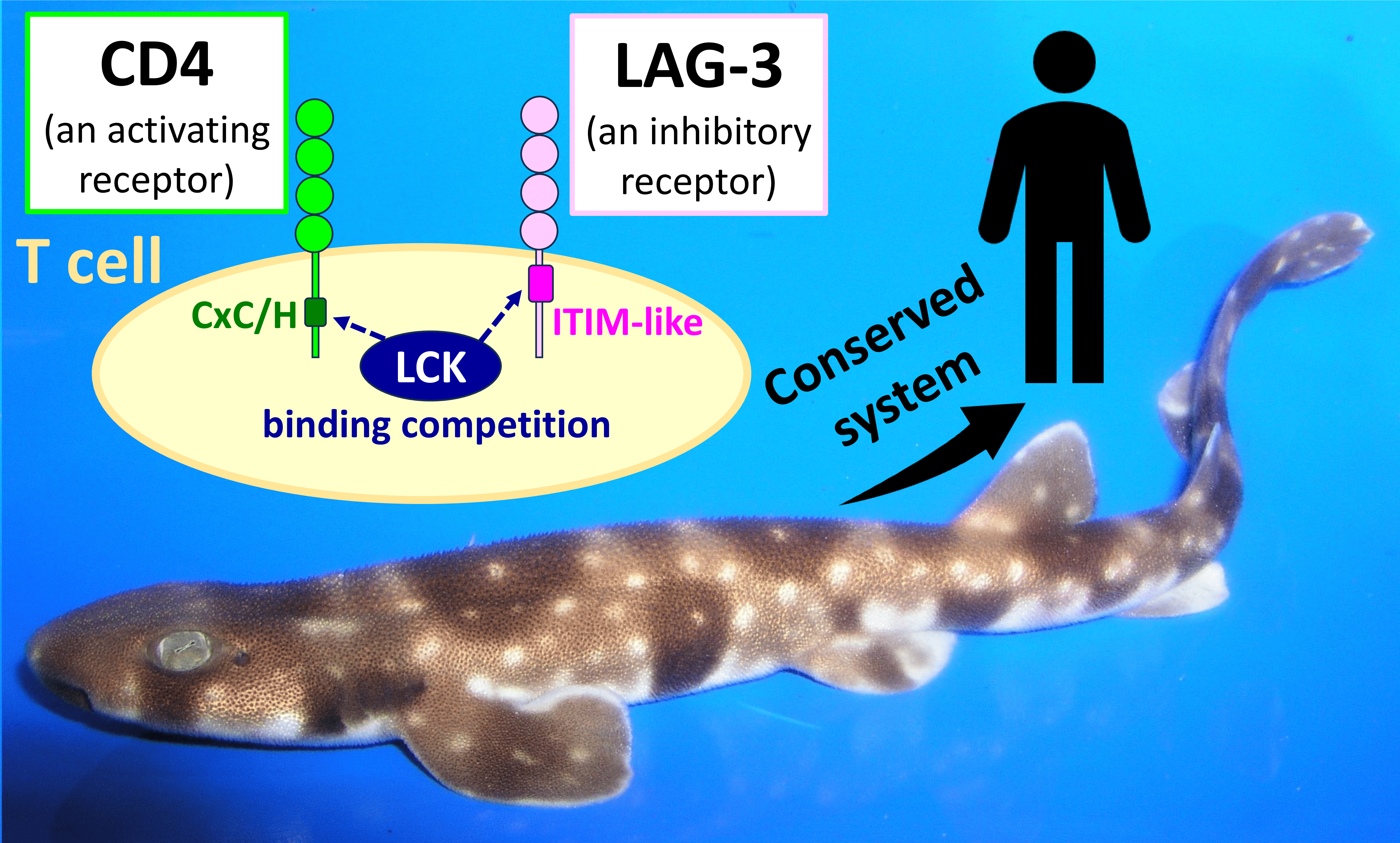
Conservation of their respective cytoplasmic tail motifs, CxC/H in the case of CD4 and an ITIM-like motif in the case of LAG-3, supports that competition between CD4 and LAG-3 for binding of kinase LCK is a conserved core part of the jawed vertebrate immune system.

LAG-3 is closely related to CD4, with which it shares the ability to bind MHC class II molecules. Although there has been conflicting information on which motifs in the LAG-3 cytoplasmic tail are important for function, evolutionary conservation patterns combined with functional studies imply that the evolutionarily conserved core function of LAG-3 is an inhibitory competition through an immunoreceptor tyrosine-based inhibitory motif (ITIM)–like motif with the activating receptors CD4 or CD8 for binding the kinase LCK.

== Gene ==
The LAG3 gene contains 8 exons. The sequence data, exon/intron organization, and chromosomal localization all indicate a close relationship of LAG3 to CD4. The gene for LAG-3 lies adjacent to the gene for CD4 on human chromosome 12 (12p13) and is approximately 20% identical to the CD4 gene, and this gene organization can already be found in sharks.

== Protein ==
The LAG3 protein, which belongs to immunoglobulin (Ig) superfamily, comprises a 503-amino acid type I transmembrane protein with four extracellular Ig-like domains, designated D1 to D4. When human LAG-3 was cloned in 1990 it was found to have approx. 70% homology with murine LAG3. The homology of pig LAG3 is 78%.

== Tissue distribution ==
LAG-3 is expressed on activated T cells, natural killer cells, B cells and plasmacytoid dendritic cells.

== Function ==
LAG3's main ligand is MHC class II, to which it binds with higher affinity than CD4. The protein negatively regulates cellular proliferation, activation, and homeostasis of T cells, in a similar fashion to CTLA-4 and PD-1 and has been reported to play a role in Treg suppressive function.

Fibrinogen-like protein1 FGL1, a liver-secreted protein, is another (major) LAG3 functional ligand independent of MHC-II.

LAG3 also helps maintain CD8^{+} T cells in a tolerogenic state and, working with PD-1, helps maintain CD8 exhaustion during chronic viral infection.

LAG3 is known to be involved in the maturation and activation of dendritic cells.

LAG3 has also been implicated in the transmission pathologic α-synuclein in Parkinson's disease

== Use as a pharmaceutical and as a drug target ==
There are three approaches involving LAG3 that are in clinical development.

- The first is IMP321, a soluble LAG3 which activates dendritic cells.
- The second are antibodies to LAG3 which take the brakes off the anti-cancer immune response. An example is relatlimab, an anti-LAG3 monoclonal antibody that is currently in phase 2 clinical testing. A number of additional LAG3 antibodies are in preclinical development. LAG-3 may be a better checkpoint inhibitor target than CTLA-4 or PD-1 since antibodies to these two checkpoints only activate effector T cells, and do not inhibit Treg activity, whereas an antagonist LAG-3 antibody can both activate T effector cells (by downregulating the LAG-3 inhibiting signal into pre-activated LAG-3+ cells) and inhibit induced (i.e. antigen-specific) Treg suppressive activity. Combination therapies are also ongoing involving LAG-3 antibodies and CTLA-4 or PD-1 antibodies.
- The third are agonist antibodies to LAG3 in order to blunt an autoimmune response. An example of this approach is GSK2831781 which has entered clinical testing (for plaque psoriasis).

== History ==
=== 1990 to 1999 ===
LAG3 was discovered in 1990 by Frédéric Triebel (currently Chief Scientific Officer at Immutep) when he headed the cellular immunology group in the Department of Clinical Biology at the Institut Gustave Roussy. An initial characterization of the LAG-3 protein was reported in 1992 showing that it was a ligand for MHC class II antigens while a 1995 paper showed that it bound MHC Class II better than CD4. In 1996 INSERM scientists from Strasbourg showed, in knockout mice that were deficient in both CD4 and LAG-3, that the two proteins were not functionally equivalent. The first characterization of the MHC Class II binding sites on LAG-3 were reported by Triebel's group in 1997. The phenotype of LAG-3 knockout mice, as established by the INSERM Strasbourg group in 1996, demonstrated that LAG-3 was vital for the proper functioning of natural killer cells but in 1998 Triebel, working with LAG-3 antibodies and soluble protein, found that LAG-3 did not define a specific mode of natural killing.

In May 1996, CD4^{+} T cells that were LAG-3^{+} were shown to preferentially express IFN-γ, which was up-regulated by IL-12. In 1997, it was demonstrated that IFN-γ production drives LAG-3 expression during the lineage commitment of human naive T cells. In 1998, further research showed that IFN-γ is not required for the expression but rather for the up-regulation of LAG-3. LAG-3 expression on activated human T cells is upregulated by IL-2, IL-7, and IL-12, and its expression may be controlled by CD4 regulatory elements. It was also found that LAG-3 down-modulates T cell proliferation and activation when LAG-3/MHC Class II co-caps with the CD3/TCR complex. This was confirmed in 1999 with co-capping experiments and fluorescence microscopy. In 1999, it was demonstrated that LAG-3 could be used as a cancer vaccine through cancer cell lines transfected with LAG-3.

=== 2000 to 2009. ===
In 2001, a LAG3-associated protein, called LAP, was identified, which appeared to participate in immune system down-regulation. Also in 2001, LAG3 expression was found on CD8^{+} tumor-infiltrating lymphocytes, with this LAG3 contributing to APC activation. In August 2002, the first phenotypic analysis of the murine LAG-3 was reported. Molecular analysis in November 2002 demonstrated that the inhibitory function of LAG-3 is performed via the protein's cytoplasmic domain. In 2003, MHC class II signal transduction pathways in human dendritic cells induced by LAG3 were identified. It was also shown that the absence of LAG3 caused no defect in T cell function.

In May 2004, it was shown through LAG3 knockout mice that LAG-3 negatively regulates T cell expansion and controls the size of the memory T cell pool. This was in contrast to earlier **in vitro** work suggesting that LAG-3 was necessary for T cell expansion. Research published in October 2004 identified LAG3's key role in regulatory T cells. In December 2004, it was reported that LAG-3 is cleaved within the D4 transmembrane domain into two fragments that remain membrane-associated: a 54-kDa fragment containing all the extracellular domains, which oligomerizes with full-length LAG-3 (70 kDa) on the cell surface via the D1 domain, and a 16-kDa peptide containing the transmembrane and cytoplasmic domains, which is subsequently released as soluble LAG-3.

In January 2005, it was shown that LAG-3 expression by tumor cells would recruit APCs into the tumor, leading to a Th1 immune response. In March 2005, it was reported that SNPs on LAG3 conferred susceptibility to multiple sclerosis. However, later work found no significant association. In June 2005, it was demonstrated that antibodies to LAG-3 result in T cell expansion, due to increased rounds of cell division that LAG-3 signaling would normally block. In July 2005, it was established that LAG3 expression on B cells is induced by T cells.

In 2006, it was demonstrated that LAG-3 could be used as a biomarker to assess the induction of Th-type responses in recipients of acellular pertussis vaccines.

In April 2007, LAG-3 was shown to participate in Treg-induced upregulation of CCR7 and CXCR4 on dendritic cells, leading to the development of semi-mature dendritic cells with the ability to migrate into lymphoid organs. LAG-3 was also found to play a role in immune privilege in the eye. Later in 2007, it was shown that LAG-3 maintained tolerance to self and tumor antigens through both CD4+ and CD8+ cells, independently of its role on Treg cells.

In 2009, LAG-3 was reported to appear on plasmacytoid dendritic cells. It was also shown to be a marker of Tregs that secrete IL-10.

=== 2010 to 2015. ===
In 2010, it was shown that LAG3 is an exhaustion marker for CD8+ T cells specific for Lymphocytic choriomeningitis virus, but alone did not significantly contribute to T-cell exhaustion. CD8+ Tumor-infiltrating lymphocytes specific for NY-ESO-1 were found to be negatively regulated by LAG-3 and PD-1 in ovarian cancer. It was reported that most LAG3 is housed intracellularly in multiple domains before rapid translocation to the cell surface, potentially facilitated by the microtubule organizing center and recycling endosomes during T-cell activation. LAG3 was also shown to define a potent regulatory T cell subset that is more frequently observed in cancer patients and expanded at tumor sites. Additionally, SNPs in the LAG3 gene were associated with a higher risk of multiple myeloma.

In 2011, it was reported that when antibodies to CD40L induced tolerance in allogeneic bone marrow transplantation, LAG3 played a role in the mechanism of action in CD8+ cells. It was also shown that the binding of MHC class II molecules on melanoma cells to LAG3 increased resistance to apoptosis, suggesting that antibodies to LAG3 could be relevant in melanoma therapy. Further research demonstrated that LAG3 plays a modulating role in autoimmune diabetes. Additionally, blocking PD-L1 and LAG-3 was identified as a potential therapeutic strategy for Plasmodium infection. In 2012 the St. Jude Children's Research Hospital group showed that LAG-3 and PD-1 synergistically regulate T-cell function in such a way as to allow an anti-tumoral immune response to be blunted. Scientists at Hanyang University in Seoul showed that tetravalent CTLA4-Ig and tetravalent LAG3-Ig could synergistically prevent acute graft-versus-host disease in animal models. In 2013 scientists at the San Raffaele Scientific Institute in Milan showed that LAG3 was a marker of type 1 Tregs.

In 2014, it was shown that LAG engagement could reduce alloreactive T cell responses following bone marrow transplantation. A subset of HIV-specific LAG3(+)CD8(+) T cells was identified, which negatively correlated with plasma viral load. LAG3 expression on plasmacytoid dendritic cells was found to contribute to creating an immune-suppressive environment in melanoma. It was also demonstrated that LAG-3 translocates to the cell surface in activated T cells via its cytoplasmic domain through protein kinase C signaling.

In 2015, it was demonstrated that LAG3 on Tregs works with TGF beta 3 to suppress antibody production. Additionally, research in rhesus macaques showed that Mycobacterium tuberculosis modulates the anti-bacterial immune response through LAG3. Furthermore, it was shown that LAG3 plays a role in the immunosuppressive capacity of Tregs stimulated by Peyer's patch B cells.
