= Frédéric Triebel =

French immunologist (born 1954)

- Born: 20 November 1954 (age 71); Douala, Cameroon
- Known for: Discovering LAG-3
- Scientific career
- Fields: Immunology, Translational medicine
- Institutions: Institut Gustave Roussy, University of Paris XI, Immutep, Prima BioMed

Frédéric Triebel (born 20 November 1954) is a French immunologist who is best known for his 1990 discovery of the LAG3 immune control mechanism. Triebel worked through the 1990s in a collaboration between Institut Gustave Roussy and Merck Serono to establish LAG-3's mechanism of action in T cells and dendritic cells. In 2001 he founded Immutep SA, a biotech company, to develop the therapeutic potential of LAG3. In 2014 this company was acquired by Prima BioMed, where Triebel remains Chief Scientific and Medical Officer.

== Early life and education ==
He completed his Doctor of Medicine degree at Poitiers University in 1981 and then a four-year clinical hematology fellowship in Paris hospitals. In 1983, Frédéric Triebel received the Gold Medal of the Paris Medicine University. In parallel, Triebel gained a PhD in Immunology at the University of Paris VI in 1985. His PhD thesis was in the field of immunogenetics, focused on the mechanisms that activate human antigen-specific T-cells.

== Career ==
From 1986 until the late 1990s, Triebel headed the cellular immunology group in the Department of Clinical Biology of the Institut Gustave Roussy. In 1990 he gained a Chair in Molecular Immunogenetics and Biotherapy at the University of Paris XI. Between 1991 and 1996 was director of an INSERM unit (U333). He founded Immutep SA in 2001 in order to develop the clinical potential of LAG3 and stayed with this company through to its acquisition by Prima BioMed in 2014. Triebel remains Chief Scientific and Medical Officer of Immutep.

From 1993 to 1998, Frédéric Triebel was appointed as member of the Institut Universitaire de France.

== Work on LAG3 prior to 2001 ==
Triebel reported the first cloning of the LAG3 gene in 1990, and two years later his team were able to show that the LAG-3 protein was a ligand for MHC Class II molecules like CD4. In 1997 the Triebel lab identified the LAG-3 amino-acid residues involved in LAG-3/MHC class II interaction. In 1998 Triebel et al. performed the first characterization of the human CD4/LAG-3 gene locus, in the process identifying the LAG-3 promoter regulatory elements. Also in 1998 the Triebel team were the first to characterizing the negative regulatory role of LAG-3 on CD3/TCR signaling. His team was the first to show that, as a soluble molecule, LAG-3 activates antigen-presenting cells through MHC class II signalling, resulting in antigen-specific T-cell responses. Soluble LAG3, in a dimeric recombinant form called LAG-3Ig is now Immutep's lead compound.

== Immutep ==
Frédéric Triebel founded Immutep in 2001 with John Hawken, a bioentrepreneur, to acquire the intellectual property which Triebel had created with INSERM and the Institut Gustave Roussy related to LAG3 and then move LAG3-based products into the clinic. Serono granted an exclusive worldwide license. The company raised €2.5m in venture capital in late 2003 and another €2.5m in January 2005. Between 2001 and 2014 Immutep scientists did further basic and applied research on LAG3 and also completed a number of clinical studies, most notable in metastatic renal cell carcinoma in 2009 and metastatic breast cancer in 2010. Immutep was sold to Prima BioMed in 2014 for US$25m.

== Distinctions ==
- 1983: Gold Medal, Paris Residency program
- 2000: Prix Lucien Tartois de la Fondation pour la Recherche Médicale
