= Institut Gustave Roussy =

Coordinates: 48°47′41″N 2°20′55″E

Gustave Roussy
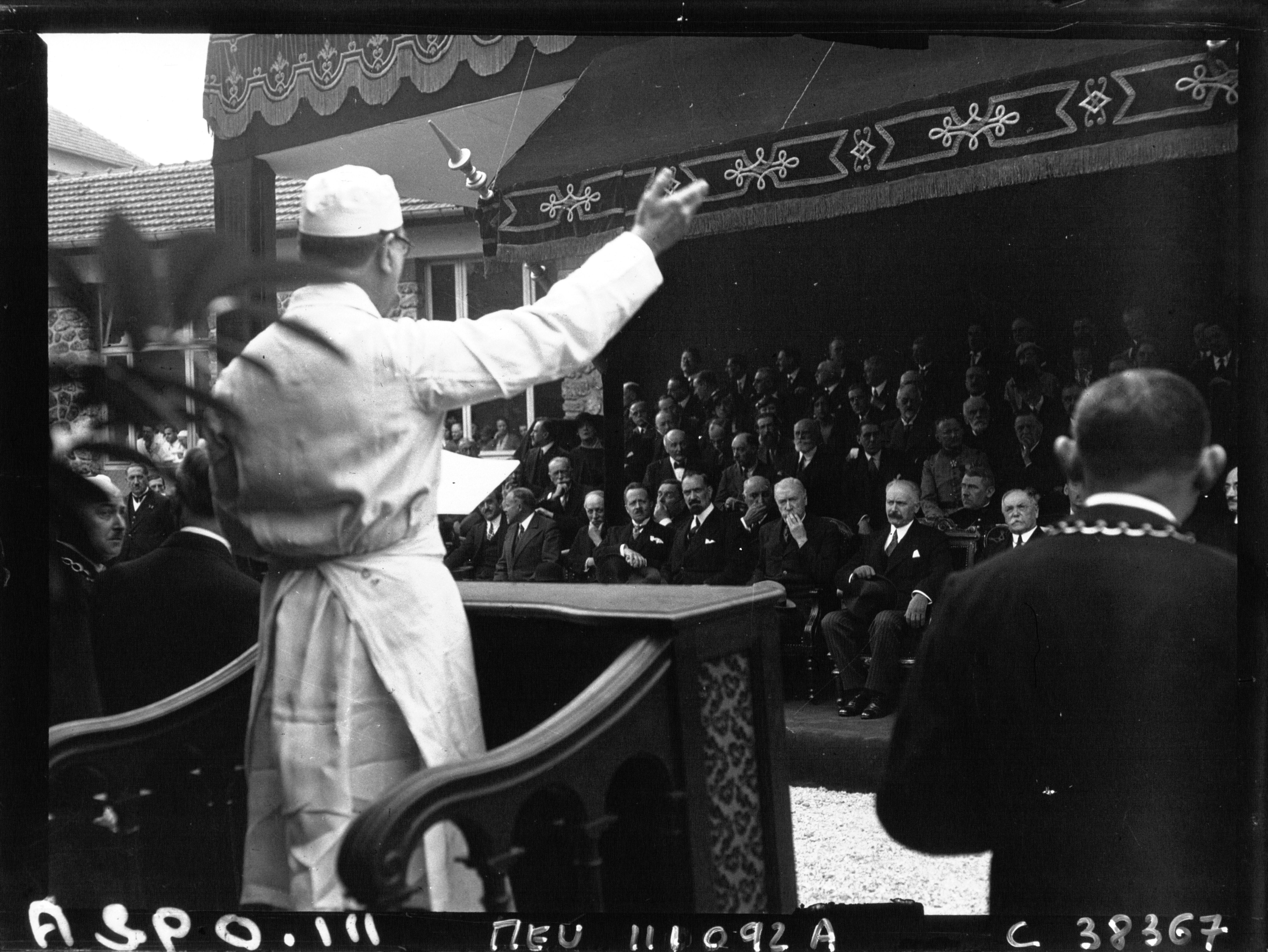
- 1934 inauguration

Geography
- Location: Villejuif, France

Organisation
- Type: Research center, Teaching Hospital

Services
- Emergency department: Yes
- Beds: 457

History
- Opened: 1926

Links
- Website: https://www.gustaveroussy.fr/en
- Lists: Hospitals in France

Institut Gustave Roussy (French pronunciation: [ɛ̃stity ɡystav ʁusi]), sometimes called Gustave Roussy, is a cancer research hospital in Europe. It is located near Paris. It is named after Gustave Roussy, a Swiss-French neuropathologist.

In April 2019, three new interventional radiology rooms were inaugurated, making it the largest facility of this type in Europe dedicated to oncology. Gustave Roussy carries out more than 4,000 interventional radiology procedures each year.

== Notable people ==
- Suzette Delaloge, oncologist and head of the department of breast pathology
- Georges Mathé, oncologist and immunologist who performed in 1959 the first successful bone marrow transplant not performed on identical twins.
- Frédéric Triebel, discoverer of the immune checkpoint molecule LAG3, who worked at the institute from 1986 until around 2001
- Maurice Tubiana, fifth director (1982–1988) and member of the French Academy of Sciences
- Barbara Tudek (1952–2019), biologist and professor who served as president of the Polish section of the European Environmental Mutagenesis and Genomics Society
- Gustave Roussy, first director (1921–1947)

== Gustave-Roussy School of Cancer Sciences ==
Together with the Faculty of Medicine of the University of Paris-Saclay, the Institut Gustave Roussy runs the School of Cancer Sciences, a university division specializing in oncology. The lessons take place at the Cancer Campus in Villejuif in the Val-de-Marne.

In the various courses offered by the faculty of medicine (adult, adolescent and child oncology; surgery; best practices; medical imaging; radiotherapy; other courses), the establishment integrates the Doctoral School of Oncology, Biology, Medicine, Health (and its Master 2 in Biology and Health, Cancerology specialty), created with the École Normale Supérieure Paris-Saclay.

Directed in 2015 by Pierre Blanchard, the school had trained nearly 2,800 students and awarded 26 university degrees.

== Awards and rankings ==
In 2020, the Institut Gustave Roussy was ranked as the first leading cancer hospital in Europe and in the top five best specialized hospitals in the world.

== Incidents ==
In 2017, a virologist from the Institut Gustave Roussy was sentenced to 5 years in prison for poisoning colleagues with sodium azide in 2014.
