= Investigaciones Geográficas =

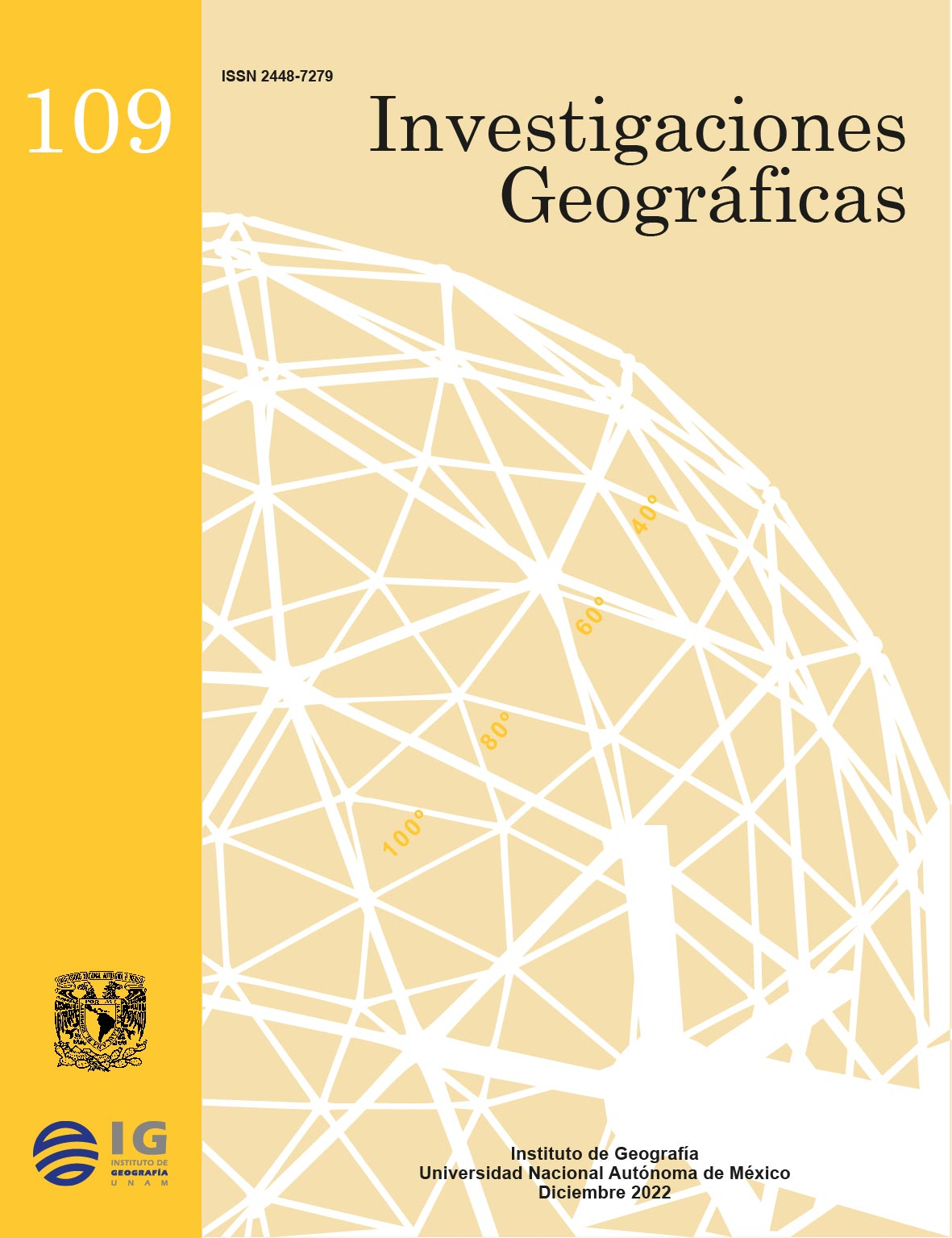
- Discipline: Geography
- Language: Spanish

Publication details
- History: 1969–present
- Publisher: Instituto de Geografía, UNAM (Mexico)
- Frequency: Quarterly
- Open access: Yes

Standard abbreviations
- ISO 4: Investig. Geogr.

Indexing
- ISSN: 0379-8682 (print); 2448-7279 (web)

Links
- Journal homepage; Online archive

Investigaciones Geográficas: Boletín del Instituto de Geografía) is a peer-reviewed academic journal dealing with geography. Its scope includes society, the environment, cultural aspects and empiracal as well a theoretical contributions. It is indexed in Scopus, CONACYT, Geographical Abstracts, Periódica, Current, Geographical Publications, GeoDados, Elsevier Biobase, Aquatic Sciences and Fisheries Abstracts, Redalyc, Latindex and SciELO. It is a quarterly journal published for the first time in 2019. In 2019 it published its 100th issue.

It is published in Mexico City by the Institute of Geography of the National Autonomous University of Mexico (UNAM).
