= Brazilian Archives of Biology and Technology =

- Discipline: Biology
- Language: English
- Edited by: Paulo Vitor Farago

Publication details
- Former name: Arquivos de Biologia e Tecnologia
- History: 1946–present
- Publisher: Instituto de Tecnologia do Paraná (Brazil)
- Frequency: Continuous
- Open access: Yes
- License: CC BY-NC
- Impact factor: 1 (2022)

Standard abbreviations
- ISO 4: Braz. Arch. Biol. Technol.

Indexing
- CODEN: BABTFC
- ISSN: 1516-8913 (print); 1678-4324 (web)
- LCCN: 59028070
- OCLC no.: 60638347

Links
- Journal homepage; Online access; Online archive

The Brazilian Archives of Biology and Technology is a continuous peer-reviewed scientific journal covering all areas of fundamental and applied biology. It was established in 1946 as the Arquivos de Biologia e Tecnologia, publishing in Portuguese. It obtained its current name in 1998, when it switched to publication in English only. It is published on SciELO by the Technology Institute of Paraná.

== Abstracting and indexing ==
The journal is abstracted and indexed in:

- Biological Abstracts
- Chemical Abstracts Service
- Current Contents/Agriculture, Biology & Environmental Sciences
- LILACS
- Science Citation Index Expanded
- Scopus
- The Zoological Record

According to the Journal Citation Reports, the journal has a 2022 impact factor of 1.0.
