= Journal Article Tag Suite =

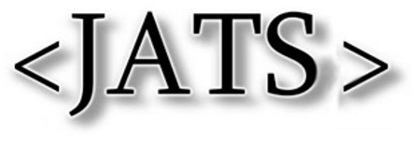
- Abbreviation: JATS
- Status: Published
- First published: 31 March 2003
- Latest version: NISO JATS 1.4; 31 October 2024
- Organization: National Information Standards Organization; American National Standards Institute
- Authors: National Center for Biotechnology Information; National Information Standards Organization
- Base standards: XML
- Related standards: NISO Standards Tag Set (NISO-STS); Book Interchange Tag Suite (BITS); SciELO Publishing Schema (SPS)
- Domain: Academic publishing; Semantic publishing
- Website: jats.nlm.nih.gov

The Journal Article Tag Suite (JATS) is format used to describe scientific literature published online. It is a technical standard developed by the National Information Standards Organization (NISO) and approved by the American National Standards Institute with the code Z39.96-2012.

The NISO project was a continuation of the work done by NLM/NCBI, and popularized by the NLM's PubMed Central as a de facto standard for archiving and interchange of scientific open-access journals and its contents with XML.

With the NISO standardization the NLM initiative has gained a wider reach, and several other repositories, such as SciELO and Redalyc, adopted the XML formatting for scientific articles.

The JATS provides a set of XML elements and attributes for describing the textual and graphical content of journal articles as well as some non-article material such as letters, editorials, and book and product reviews. JATS allows for descriptions of the full article content or just the article header metadata; and allows other kinds of contents, including research and non-research articles, letters, editorials, and book and product reviews.

== History ==
Since its introduction, NCBI's NLM Archiving and Interchange DTD suite has become the de facto standard for journal article markup in scholarly publishing. With the introduction of NISO JATS, it has been elevated to a true standard. Even without public data interchange, the advantages of NISO JATS adoption affords publishers in terms of streamlining production workflows and optimizing system interoperability.

=== Timeline ===
NLM JATS
NLM JATS, version 1
- 31 March 2003: NLM DTD v1.0 introduced.
- 5 November 2003: Version 1.1 update released.
NLM JATS, version 2
- 30 December 2004: Version 2.0 major update released. It is designed to support customization best-practices.
- 14 November 2005: Version 2.1 update released with the addition the Article Authoring DTD.
- 8 June 2006: Version 2.2 update released.
- 28 March 2007: Version 2.3 update released.
NLM JATS, version 3

- 21 November 2008: Version 3.0 major update released.
NISO JATS
NISO JATS, version 1.0
- 30 March 2011 – 30 September 2011: First draft, NISO Z39.96.201x version 0.4 released; six-month comment period.
- 15 July 2012: NISO JATS, v1.0 received NISO approval.
- 9 August 2012: NISO JATS, v1.0 received ANSI approval.
- 22 August 2012: ANSI/NISO Z39.96-2012, JATS: Journal Article Tag Suite (version 1.0) published. It supports full backward-compatibility with NLM JATS v3.0.
NISO JATS, version 1.1
- 9 December 2013: First draft, NISO JATS, v1.1d1 released.
- 29 December 2014: Second draft, NISO JATS, v1.1d2 released.
- 14 April 2015: Third draft, NISO JATS, v1.1d released.
- 22 October 2015: NISO JATS, v1.1 received NISO approval.
- 19 November 2015: NISO JATS, v1.1 received ANSI approval
- 6 January 2016: ANSI/NISO Z39.96-2015, JATS: Journal Article Tag Suite, version 1.1 published.
NISO JATS, version 1.2
- 20 July 2017: First draft, NISO JATS, v1.2d1 released.
- 23 May 2018: First draft, NISO JATS, v1.2d2 released.
- 8 February 2019: ANSI/NISO Z39.96-2019, JATS: Journal Article Tag Suite, version 1.2 published.
NISO JATS, version 1.3
- 7 July 2021: ANSI/NISO Z39.96-2021, JATS: Journal Article Tag Suite, version 1.3 published.
NISO JATS, version 1.4
- 31 October 2024: ANSI/NISO Z39.96-2024, JATS: Journal Article Tag Suite, version 1.4 published.

== Technical scope ==
By design, this is a model for journal articles, such as the typical research article found in an STM journal, and not a model for complete journals.

=== Tag sets ===
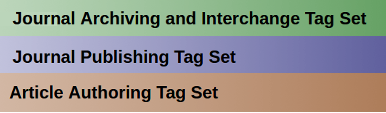
The 3 specifications. Due to their color-coded documentation, are colloquially referred to by color.

There are three tag sets:

Journal Archiving and Interchange (Green)
"The most permissive of the Tag Sets," primarily intended for the capture and archiving of extant journal data.
Journal Publishing (Blue)
"A moderately prescriptive Tag Set," intended for general use in journal production and publication.
Formally this model is a subset of the Archiving model. This is the most frequently used JATS variant.
Article Authoring (Orange)
"The most prescriptive [tightest and smallest] of the Tag Sets," intended for the relatively lightweight creation of journal articles valid to JATS.
Formally this model a subset of the Publishing model.

Document type definitions (also released in the form of RELAX NG and XML schema) define each set and incorporate other standards such as MathML and XHTML Tables (although not in the XHTML namespace).

=== Document structure ===
JATS Publishing set defines a document that is a top-level component of a journal such as an article, a book or product review, or a letter to the editor. Each such document is composed of front matter (required) and up to three optional parts. These must appear in the following order:

Front matter
The article front matter contains the metadata for the article (also called article header information), for example, the article title, the journal in which it appears, the date and issue of publication for that issue of that journal, a copyright statement, etc. Both article-level and issue-level metadata (in the element <article-meta>) and journal-level metadata (in the element <journal-meta>) may be captured.
Body (of the article)
The body of the article is the main textual and graphic content of the article. This usually consists of paragraphs and sections, which may themselves contain figures, tables, sidebars (boxed text), etc. The body of the article is optional to accommodate those repositories that just keep article header information and do not tag the textual content.
Back matter
If present, the article back matter contains information that is ancillary to the main text, such as a glossary, appendix, or list of cited references.
Floating material
A publisher may choose to place all the floating objects in an article and its back matter (such as tables, figures, boxed text sidebars, etc.) into a separate container element outside the narrative flow for convenience of processing.

Following the front, body, back, and floating material, there may be either one or more responses to the article or one or more subordinate articles.

== Example ==
This is the minimal article's structure,

<?xml version="1.0" encoding="UTF-8"?>
<!DOCTYPE article
  PUBLIC "-//NLM//DTD JATS (Z39.96) Journal Publishing DTD v1.0 20120330//EN"
         "JATS-journalpublishing1.dtd"
>
<article dtd-version="1.0" article-type="article" specific-use="migrated"
 xmlns:mml="http://www.w3.org/1998/Math/MathML" xmlns:xlink="http://www.w3.org/1999/xlink" 
>
  <front>...</front>
  <body>...</body>
  <back>...</back>
</article>

The DOCTYPE header is optional, a legacy from SGML and DTD-oriented validators. The dtd-version attribute can be used even without a DTD header.

The root element article is common for any version of JATS or "JATS family", as NLM DTDs. The rules for front, body and back tags validation, depends on the JATS version, but all versions have similar structure, with good compatibility in a range of years. The evolution of the schema preserves an overall stability.

Less common, "only front", "only front and back" variations are also used for other finalities than full-content representation. The general article composition (as an DTD-content expression) is

   (front, body?, back?, floats-group?, (sub-article* | response*))

== Tools ==
There are a variety of tools for create, edit, convert and transform JATS. They range from simple forms to complete conversion automation:

=== Conversion to JATS ===
Take as input a scientific document, and, with some human support, produce a JATS output.

- OpenOffice (LibreOffice) and MS Word documents to JATS:
  - Typeset: provides automated set of converters for MS-Word to JATS XML.
  - OxGarage: can convert documents from various formats into "National Library of Medicine (NLM) DTD 3.0".
  - meTypeset: meTypeset "is a fork of the OxGarage stack" "to convert from Microsoft Word .docx format to NLM/JATS-XML".
  - eXtyles: automates time-consuming aspects of document editing in Microsoft Word and exports to JATS XML (as well as many other DTDs).
- Markdown to JATS: Pandoc 2.0 can convert a number of input formats to JATS.
- PDF to JATS: this is a very difficult problem to solve. Metadata hides in the page furniture, references require matching to recover DOIs, and cross-references appear as characters. Scanned PDFs are even more difficult because the data exists in the form of pixels, and it needs to be recovered from how the page looks. Success depends on how well structured your PDFs are and, for batch conversion, how consistently structured your PDFs are.
  - Shabash Merops
  - Typeset's PDF to JATS XML Converter
  - The Public Knowledge Project is developing a pipeline for converting PDF to JATS. It will include use of pdfx.
  - CERMINE Content ExtRactor and MINEr

=== Conversion from JATS ===
Take JATS as input, produce another kind of document as output.

- from JATS to HTML
  - JATS Preview Stylesheets (canonical XSLT conversion), see classical (2013) conversor.
  - eLife Lens converts NLM XML to JSON for displaying using HTML and Javascript.
- from JATS to PDF: some JATS Preview Stylesheets, XSLT + XSL-FO conversion.
- from JATS to EPUB.
- Generic (from JATS DTD): DtdAnalyzer — compare JATS with other DTDs and helps into create a XML representation, XSLT and Schematron generation, and other tools.

=== Editors ===
- Typeset provides a WYSIWYM editor for scholarly articles. Supports XML exports in NISO JATS and NLM JATS standards. It is mostly used by Journals and Publishers looking to convert author submitted MS-Word files to XML, PDF, HTML and ePuB.
- JATS Framework for oXygen XML Editor: users of oXygen XML Editor and oXygen XML Author can now install support for current versions of NISO JATS (and as a bonus, NLM BITS). Based on an identifier given in a DOCTYPE declaration, oXygen will detect that you are editing a JATS document and provide stylesheets and utilities.
- FontoXML for JATS: WYSIWYS editor for editing and reviewing JATS content:
- PubRef "Pipeline": Browser-based realtime-preview JATS editor:
- Annotum: a WordPress theme that contains WYSIWYG authoring in JATS (Kipling subset), peer-review and editorial management, and publishing.
- JATS edition for web-based XML editor Xeditor.
- Texture Editor of the Substance Consortium. The first online "born to JATS" editor.
- Libero Editor, developed by eLife describes itself as 'A user-friendly editing interface designed for publishing staff and authors for the production of high-quality JATS XML.'

=== Preview ===
Tools that render JATS as HTML, usually on fly.

- JATS Preview Stylesheets: the JATS Preview Stylesheets are a series of .xsl, .xpl, .css, and .sch files that will create .html or .pdf versions of valid NISO Z39.96-2012 JATS 1.0 files. It is primarily intended for internal use by publishers and a basis for customization.
- Typeset - Allows to generate HTML from JATS XML within a click. Also, offers capacity to generate custom HTML based on the requirements of the journal.
- PubReader – "The PubReader view is an alternative web presentation ... Designed particularly for enhancing readability on tablet and other small screen devices, PubReader can also be used on desktops and laptops and from multiple web browsers".

=== Customization ===
- Jatsdoc - Produces documentation for any particular JATS customization. Jatsdoc is integrated with NCBI's DtdAnalyzer.

== JATS central repositories ==
As NISO JATS began the de facto and de jure standard for open access journals, the scientific community has adopted the JATS repositories as a kind of legal deposit, sometimes deemed more valuable than the traditional digital libraries where only a PDF version is stored. Open knowledge need richer and structured formats as JATS: PDF and JATS must be certified as "same content", and the set "PDF+JATS" forming the unit of legal deposit. List of JATS repositories and its contained:

- PubMed Central: (please check these numbers)
  - US PubMed Central: in 2016 ~3.8 million articles
  - Europe PubMed Central: in 2016 ~3,7 million articles
- SciELO: in 2016 ~0.6 million articles

These repositories do overlap and the same article can be held by more than one repository.

== Alternatives and semantic ==
There are some effort and experiments using RDF conversion in the 2012, with no impact in the JATS community.

Later, in ~2016, for Semantic Web context, with SchemaOrg initiative, the class ScholarlyArticle was defined, receiving better reception. It is an initial "JATS-like standardization" for RDF contexts of use.

== See also ==
Related to

- IMRAD (Introduction, Methods, Results, and Discussion)
- NISO
- Open science data
- Scientific literature
- Semantic publishing
- Separation of presentation and content
- XML

Used by (digital preservation)

- PubMed Central
- SciELO

Used by (publishing)

- Elsevier
- NPG
- Open Journal Systems
- PLOS

Similar to

- DocBook
- Text Encoding Initiative
- SchemaOrg (ScholarlyArticle)
- XHTML
