= Lillycrop =

Lillycrop is a surname of English origin. People with that name include:

- George Lillycrop (1886 – after 1944), English football player and manager
- Karen Lillycrop (active from 2007), English molecular biologist
- Tom Lillycrop (born 1991), English rugby league player
