= Revista Colombiana de Estadística =

1968 scientific journal

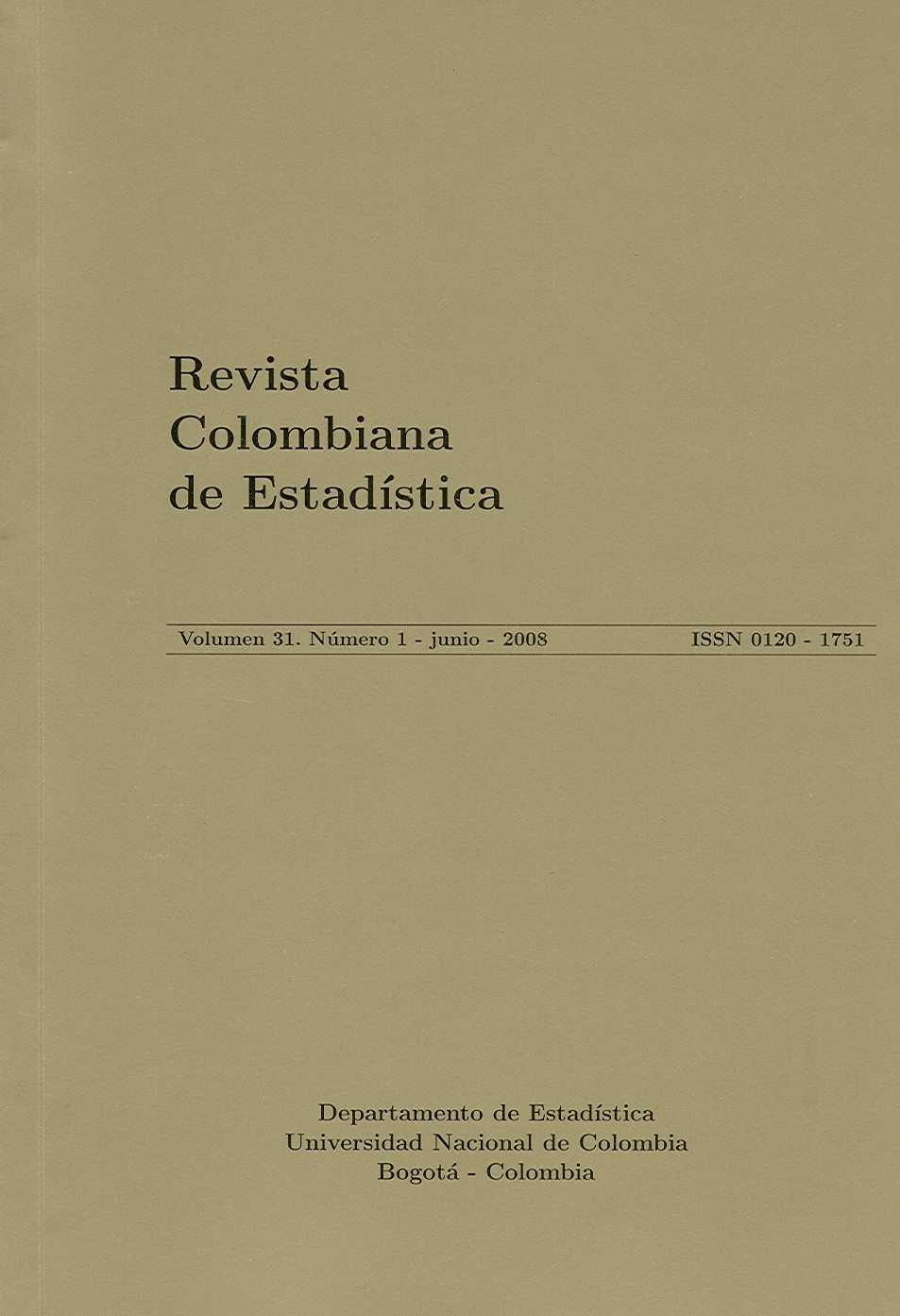
- Discipline: Statistics
- Language: English
- Edited by: Leonardo Trujillo

Publication details
- History: 1968, 1981–present
- Publisher: National University of Colombia (Colombia)
- Frequency: Biannually
- Impact factor: 0.179 (2014)

Standard abbreviations
- ISO 4: Rev. Colomb. Estad.
- MathSciNet: Rev. Colombiana Estadíst.

Indexing
- ISSN: 0120-1751 (print); 2389-8976 (web)
- OCLC no.: 229174225

Links
- Journal homepage

The Revista Colombiana de Estadística (English: Colombian Journal of Statistics) is a biannual peer-reviewed scientific journal on statistics published by the National University of Colombia. It covers research on statistics, including applications, statistics education, and the history of statistics.

== History ==
The Revista Colombiana de Estadística was established in 1968. During the first years, the journal only published papers in Spanish but since 1985 it also publishes papers in English. The journal stopped publication between 1969 and 1979. In 1979, it was relaunched by Luis Thorin and since 1981 the publication has been continuous with two issues per year. Recently, since 2011 the Journal only publishes articles in English language.

== Abstracting and indexing ==
The Revista Colombiana de Estadística is abstracted and indexed in Scopus, SciELO, Current Index to Statistics, Mathematical Reviews, Zentralblatt MATH, Redalyc, Latindex, and Publindex (category A1). According to the Journal Citation Reports, the journal has a 2014 impact factor of 0.179.

== See also ==
- List of statistics journals
