= Infomed =

Infomed is the Cuban health portal and the network of people and institutions that share the purpose of facilitating the access to the health information in Cuba.

== History ==
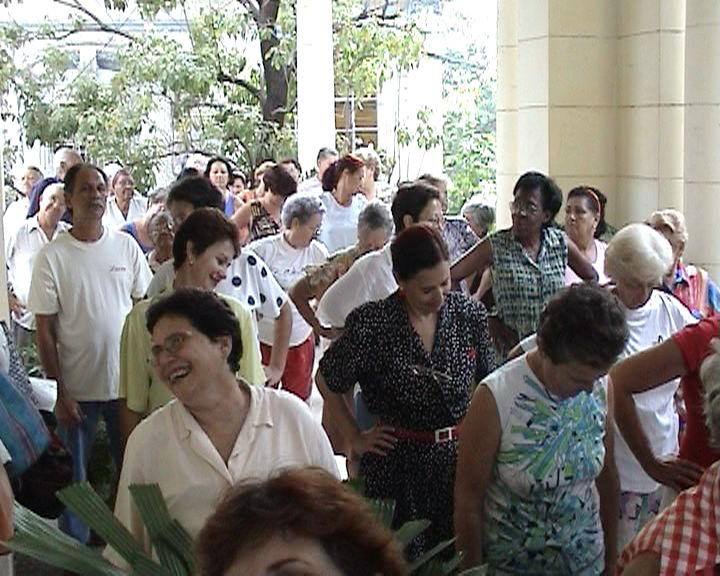
Infomed staff gather in the Infomed lobby on the day of the worldwide challenge for health.

Infomed started in 1992 as a project to interconnect the information centers and the medical libraries in Cuba, and it is today a network with national reach. The project has received awards and international recognition, in particular the Stockholm Challenge Award in 2002.

It is a network of people and institutions that share the purpose of facilitating access to information and knowledge to improve the health of the Cuban people and other people of the World, by intensive and creative use of the information and communication technologies.

The first international steps of this network were participating in a project of the Pan-American Health Organization and the National Library of Medicine of the USA to access MEDLINE with the help of e-mail through the project BITNIS. The network started as an initiative of the Medical Sciences Information National Center, that was founded in 1965 to take care of the information needs of doctors and other health workers.

A characteristic of the project has been the use of the information and communication technologies with a social vision and with the developments of local capabilities. It was the first national network in utilizing the Linux operating system in all its servers for the development of national content and adequate services to its health system. Since 1994 it has placed the complete texts of the Cuban medical magazines in internet and encouraged the development of specialized sites in the most diverse subjects of the medical sciences and public health.

It provides the users with access to scientific and technical information assistance, administration, education and research in health, turning them in active producers of information and knowledge. It offers content and services with the goal of offering to the user information to satisfy their needs.

== Development ==
The network has tens of thousands of users in Cuba and its portal is visited by many users from around the world. The network is composed of libraries and units of information that cover all health areas in the country. It has worked with the model of at least one library in each area of health.

The Virtual Library of Health, (BVS in Spanish)] that is part of the Virtual Libraries of Health of Latin America and the Caribbean; promoted by BIREME, that is the Health Information Center of Latin America and Caribbean, based in São Paulo, Brazil, the Pan-American Health Organization and the World Health Organization. It also has the Cuban Virtual University of Health, a virtual convention center, sites of medical specialties and many other services, such as, directories, bibliographic data bases, health statistics, a collection of lectures and presentations of specialized subjects, diagnostic discussions, inquiries services to experts and other services.

Infomed’s Portal consists of a network of specialized portals of medical sciences and health subjects that are maintained by groups of specialists, scientific societies and libraries and institutional, municipal and provincial information centers. It also offers a daily health news service and specialized information services.

== Sources of information ==
Among Infomed's most important information sources is the collection of the complete text of the main Cuban Medical Journals. An important group of them form the collection Scielo Cuba that is part of the Virtual Library of Health. The Virtual Library of Health also has an important collection of books of medical sciences and health published by Cuban authors.

== Publications ==
The Journal of Medical Internet Research, recognized Infomed as a model for integration of health care information with research, education and the provision of services. The applicability of the Cuban model in other nations is recognized, within the context of varying ideological and social structures.

== Infomed 2.0 Project ==
Infomed 2.0 is the name that synthesizes the proposal to move to a new phase of the development of the network that is supported by the collective work of its members. The name was inspired by the concept of Web 2.0 that incorporates the technological, organizational and cultural changes that are being produced in the Internet and particularly in the Web.

Since its beginnings Infomed was conceived and developed under the concept of a decentralized model of collective construction. Evidence of this is the development of nodes in all the provinces, the creation of territorial domains, the development of sites and Web pages at all levels, the sustained incorporation of users and the wide production of content and services during times when blogs, wikis and other present forms of communication did not exist and that today represent the idea of Web 2.0. The development of the network of sites of specialties is an example of this type and the existence of pages of professionals and other groups are important antecedents of what today people are seeking to develop.

Infomed aims to develop a health ecosystem of people, services and sources of information, supported by products and services for information, communication and collaboration. It is described as being centered on its users and built with their active participation.

To that end, opportunities that provide a set of technological tools and methods for operating the web contribute to the simplification of accessing technology and the growing significance of the role of individuals and the ways of working in teams and collectives.

Although there are still pending important investment in infrastructure and communications, these are problems that will be solved in the short and medium term. However, the most important challenge is on the side of human resources.

It has been proposed to start designing, implementing and maintaining services aligned with the Infomed 2.0 philosophy. The models are a base, a reference, not a scheme. Each person that uses them must help create or generate new models, continuously improve the existing ones and provide feedback for its use in practice.
