= Revista Austral de Ciencias Sociales =

- Discipline: Social science
- Language: Spanish
- Edited by: Ricardo Molina Verdejo

Publication details
- History: 1997-present
- Publisher: Austral University of Chile (Chile)
- Frequency: Biannual

Standard abbreviations
- ISO 4: Rev. Austral Cienc. Soc.

Indexing
- ISSN: 0717-3202 (print); 0718-1795 (web)
- OCLC no.: 85448809

Links
- Journal homepage; Online access

Revista Austral de Ciencias Sociales is a biannual peer-reviewed academic journal specialising in social science, including fields such as history and archaeology. It was established in 1997 and is published by the Austral University of Chile. The journal is abstracted and indexed in Scopus, Redalyc, and Latindex.
