= Redalyc =

Bibliographic database and digital library of open access journals

- Producer: Universidad Autónoma del Estado de México (Mexico)
- History: 2002 to present

Access
- Cost: Free

Coverage
- Disciplines: Science
- Record depth: abstract, full-text, and citation
- Format coverage: Journal articles
- Geospatial coverage: Latin America, the Caribbean, Spain and Portugal

Links
- Website: www.redalyc.org
- Title list(s): www.redalyc.org/coleccionHome.oa

The Scientific Information System Redalyc is a bibliographic database and a digital library of Open Access journals, supported by the Universidad Autónoma del Estado de México with the help of numerous other higher education institutions and information systems.

The project started in October 2002 with the general aim of building a scientific information system made up by the leading journals of all the knowledge areas edited in and about Latin America. Since its creation, its goal is: to give visibility to the scientific production generated in Ibero-America, that is underestimated worldwide due to various factors like low investment in science and technology, low participation of Latin American scientists in some of the main currents of science, as measured by percentage of articles by Latin American authors in established electronic databases e.g., MEDLINE, and the low impact of that production. Participation, measured by percentage of articles by authors of Latin America in such databases was very low in the dominant repositories e.g., 2.7% in the Science Citation Index (SCI).

As of 2015, Redalyc is an information system that also evaluates the scientific and editorial quality of knowledge in Ibero-America. A research group generates bibliometric indicators about the impact of the journals, authors and countries included in the journal electronic library. Redalyc has been consolidated as an important repository of knowledge with over 1,000 journals and more than 425,000 full-text articles.

== Scientific Journal Electronic Library ==
Organized in two main areas (social and natural sciences) and many specialised sub-sections, Redalyc gathers journals published in 15 countries, with over 550 journals and 16,000 articles available in PDF format, along with abstracts in Spanish and English languages, reference information, and other metadata. Similar to parallel projects such as Latindex, Redalyc fully embraces open access and releases its material under a Creative Commons license, making it free to download. Along with a keyword search on each page, users can browse the catalogue by title, author, country, or subject.

=== Countries ===
Argentina, Brazil, Chile, Colombia, Costa Rica, Cuba, Ecuador, Spain, Mexico, Peru, Portugal, Puerto Rico, Dominican Republic, Serbia, Uruguay and Venezuela

=== Subjects ===
==== Social Sciences and Humanities ====
Agrarian Studies, Anthropology, Art, Communication, Culture, Demography, Economy, Education, Environmental Studies, Geography, Health, History, Information Sciences, Language and Literature, Law, Multi-disciplinary studies, Philosophy and Science, Political Science, Psychology, Public Administration, Sociology and Territorial Studies

==== Natural and Exact Sciences ====
Agrarian Science, Architecture, Astronomy, Atmospheric Sciences, Biology, Chemistry, Engineering, Geology, Geophysics, Information Technology, Mathematics, Medicine, Multidisciplinaries, Oceanography, Physics and Veterinary Medicine

== Bibliometric indicators ==
Bibliometric techniques have been shown to be useful in development of indicators of scientific research activity to address emerging concerns such as institutional level analysis of capabilities and networks. Bibliometric indicators have been used for policy purposes for nearly 25 years and were developed to address central concerns of classical science policy - level of research output and its impact. They are incorporated in regular statistical series such as the National Science Foundation's (NSF) science indicators and are used in high-profile analyses by leading scientists and policy makers.

== Conversion tools ==
Redalyc database requires the submission of XML. This section lists the technologies that can be used for generating Redalyc XML.

=== To Redalyc XML ===
- MS Word documents & OpenOffice (LibreOffice) documents to Redalyc:
  - Typeset: This tool provides a set of converters as a SaaS subscription model. MS-Word to SciELO XML.
  - OxGarage and meTypeset: can convert documents from various XML formats
  - Pandoc for Redalyc XML: Happens via MS-Word to Markdown (with some loss of context) to Redalyc.

=== From Redalyc XML ===
This section describes the process of taking Redalyc XML as input, and using that to product multiple outputs.

- from Redalyc to HTML:
  - JATS Preview Stylesheets (canonical XSLT conversion)
  - Typeset Publisher Solution
  - eLife Lens converts NLM XML to JSON for displaying using HTML and JavaScript.
- from Redalyc to PDF:
  - Typeset converter for Redalyc XML to PDF
  - some JATS Preview Stylesheets, XSLT + XSL-FO conversion.
- from Redalyc to ePUB: (for mobile versions)
  - eXtyles

=== Redalyc XML Editors ===
- oXygen XML Editor
- Typeset XML Editor for Journals. Supports XML exports in compliant Redalyc Standards. Frequently used by editorial team to generate any kind of XML, PDF, HTML and ePUB.
- PubRef "Pipeline": Browser-based realtime-preview XML editor

== Usage indicators ==
Redalyc produces indicator to keep track of the publications consultation. The statistics obtained are:

- Site use
- Articles report
- Visits report
- Consults comparatives
- Global use reports
- Internationalization index
- Individual reports
- Editorial reports
- Institutional reports

== Controversy ==
In July 2015, Jeffrey Beall, an American librarian, posted an article on his blog referring to the two largest Latin American open access databases (SciELO and Redalyc) as “favelas”, which is a derogatory Portuguese term for a slum. Beall stated:

"Many North American scholars have never even heard of these meta-publishers or the journals they aggregate. Their content is largely hidden, the neighborhood remote and unfamiliar."

This perspective was dismissed by Dr Luis Reyes Galindo, Cardiff University’s School of Social Sciences:

"I suppose that by ‘North America’, Beall really means the United States of America and Canada, which... leaves at least one third of North America outside this myopic geography… ...SciELO and RedALyC are repositories centred on Iberoamerican scholarly literature, in which Spanish and Portuguese are the dominant languages. What is being suggested, it seems, is that Spanish and Portuguese scholars writing in their mother tongues should be deeply worried because English speakers are unlikely to read their work. Furthermore, we should also be ashamed of the quality of our work because a region that does not speak our language is uninterested in reading texts outside of their linguistic scope. This is analogous to suggesting that Gabriel García Márquez, Octavio Paz, Jorge Luis Borges and Machado de Assis should have been deeply disturbed because most ‘North American’ readers would’ve been uninterested in reading their works in the authors’ original mother tongues.”

Responding to the perceived ethnocentrism of Beall's published opinion of SciELO and Redalyc, a Motion was passed by the Brazilian Forum of Public Health Journals Editors and the Associação Brasileira de Saúde Coletiva (Abrasco, Brazilian Public Health Association), taking exception to Beall's characterization, drawing attention to the "ethnocentric prejudice", and correcting factual inaccuracies. The Motion draws attention to work by Vessuri, Guedon and Cetto emphasizing the value of SciELO and Redalyc to the development of science in Latin America and globally: “In fact, Latin America is using the OA publishing model to a far greater extent than any other region in the world… Also, because the sense of public mission remains strong among Latin American universities… these… initiatives demonstrate that the region contributes more and more to the global knowledge exchange while positioning research literature as a public good.”

In a critique to Beall's post, Dr. Antonio Sánchez Pereyra of the National University of Mexico wrote, “SciELO and RedAlyC have received enough recognition far enough from Latin America that Beall’s opinion can be described as... at best, uninformed.”

== Some indexed journals ==
- Revista Austral de Ciencias Sociales
- Revista Colombiana de Estadistica
- Universitas Psychologica
- Geologica Acta
- Vojnotehnicki glasnik/Military Technical Courier

== See also ==
- SciELO
- LILACS
- PubMed Central (PMC)
- Open access in Portugal
- Open access in Spain
