= Universitas Psychologica =

- Discipline: Psychology
- Language: Spanish
- Edited by: Wilson López López

Publication details
- Publisher: Pontifical Xavierian University (Colombia)

Standard abbreviations
- ISO 4: Univ. Psychol.

Indexing
- ISSN: 1657-9267 (print); 2011-2777 (web)

Links
- Journal homepage

Universitas Psychologica is a Colombian journal of psychology. It is one of the top-rated journals in Colombia, being in the highest category (A1) in Colciencias (the Colombian National Institute of Sciences) and it has been indexed in databases such as Philosopher's Info, PsycINFO, ISI Web of Knowledge, Dialnet, Redalyc, and SciELO. The journal offers access to full-text articles published from 2001.

It is edited by the Faculty of Psychology at the Pontifical Xavierian University, in Bogotá, Colombia.

== More information ==
- Official website
