= BVS =

BVS may stand for:

== Academia ==
- Bachelor of Veterinary Science, a degree
- Virtual Health Library (Spanish: Biblioteca Virtual en Salud)

== Transport ==
- Bevier and Southern Railroad (by reporting mark)
- Breves Airport (by IATA code)
- Skagit Regional Airport (by FAA LID)

== Other uses ==
- Batman v Superman: Dawn of Justice, a 2016 superhero film
- Business Valuation Standards
