= Journal of Industrial Engineering and Management =

The Journal of Industrial Engineering and Management is a triannual peer-reviewed open access scientific journal that covers research on all aspects of industrial engineering and management. It was established in 2008. It is a member of the Open Access Scholarly Publishers Association.

== Abstracting and indexing ==
The journal is abstracted and indexed in:

- Ei Compendex
- Latindex
- Scopus
- Emerging Sources Citation Index
