= Bireme (disambiguation) =

A bireme is an ancient galley warship with two decks of oars.

Bireme may also refer to:

- Bireme (horse), British Thoroughbred racehorse and broodmare best known for winning the classic Epsom Oaks in 1980
- BIREME, specialized center of the Pan-American Health Organization
