= Latin American Bibliography =

The Latin American Bibliography refers to the set of databases and information services on academic journals from Latin America and the Caribbean created by the National Autonomous University of Mexico (UNAM) in the decade of the seventies.

Nowadays, the Latin-American Bibliography is composed by the following databases: CLASE (Latin-American Citations in Social Sciences and Humanities); PERIODICA (Index of Latin-American Journals in Science); Latindex (Regional Co-operative Information System for Scholarly Journals from Latin America, the Caribbean, Spain and Portugal).

These databases were created by a group of information professionals, who identified the need to register, preserve and give access to the Latin-American knowledge published in the main academic journals of the region. Within UNAM, the fostering institution of these information products was the Science and Humanities Information Center (CICH) created in 1971.

For the size of its collection of Latin-American journals, for the quantity of compiled records and for the duration and consistency of the project, the Latin-American Bibliography produced in the UNAM constitutes one of the most valuable resources for scholars and experts specializing in Latin-American affairs.

== Products ==
Three databases are available through the web site of UNAM’s General Directorate for Libraries General Directorate for Libraries:

CLASE (Latin-American Citations in Social Sciences and Humanities). Bibliographical database, with more than 280,000 records, of which nearly 14,000 provide abstracts and links to the full text of the documents. It includes more than 1,400 journals specializing in Social Sciences, Humanities and Arts, from more than 20 countries of Latin America and the Caribbean. Documents not available in full text can be retrieved through the Document Supply Service of the Latin-American Serials Collection (Hemeroteca Latinoamericana) of the DGB.

PERIODICA (Index of Latin-American Journals in Science). Bibliographical database with more than 315,000 records, of which near 60,000 provide abstracts and links to the full text of the documents. The database indexes more than 1,500 journals specializing in Science and Technology, from more than 20 countries of Latin America and the Caribbean. Documents not available in full text can be retrieved through the Document Supply Service of the Latin-American Serials Collection (Hemeroteca Latinoamericana) of the DGB.

Latindex (Regional Co-operative Information System for Scholarly Journals from Latin America, the Caribbean, Spain and Portugal). This initiative provides relevant information and data of the scholarly journals edited in the Iberoamerican region. Three databases are produced through the collaborative work of the member institutions: Directory,: with more than 17,000 records; Catalogue, with more than 3,500 selected journals that fulfill international quality criteria and an Index of Electronic Journals, offering nearly 3,000 links to available resources in full text.

Currently, the Department of Latin-American Bibliography contributes to the production of two other Latin-American information products, Aquatic Sciences and Fisheries Abstracts and SciELO Mexico.

Over the time, other databases were produced by the Department of Latin-American Bibliography during its more than 30 years of existence, namely:

BLAT (Latin-American Bibliography I and II), with information compiled from international sources, mainly documents from Latin-American origin (produced by Latin American authors and institutions) or those in which their object of study was related to the region. The database ceased in 1997. Another one was MEXINV, as a subset of CLASE, offered bibliographical records of documents relative only to Mexico. This database ceased in the decade of the nineties.

=== Institution ===
Currently, the databases described above are produced by the Department of Latin-American Bibliography, part of the Assistant Office for Information Services of the General Directorate for Libraries (DGB) of the National Autonomous University of Mexico (UNAM). The original databases (BLAT, CLASE, PERIODICA, MEXINV and Latindex) were created by the Science and Humanities Information Center (CICH). Since the incorporation of the CICH to UNAM’s General Directorate for Libraries in 1997, this institution acts as Responsible Editor.
