= PubRef.org =

Defunct bibliography management website developed by PubMed

- Website: pubref.org
- Commercial: Yes
- Launched: 2014
- Current status: Defunct

PubRef.org was a short lived project that is now discontinued. The website is not accessible anymore. An old version can be accessed from the Internet Archive.

They used the same name PubRef which was a service provided by PubMed for linking bibliographies, defeated by the independent service Crossref.

PubRef was a composition and project management application used by researchers and students for scholarly writing and communication. PubRef uses an extended form of Markdown as a primary authoring format and converts this to JATS, the archive format used by the US National Library of Medicine.

== Research asset containerization ==
Researchers manage scholarly writing projects within version-controlled file repositories called containers that function similarly to git repositories and docker containers to provide enhanced reproducibility, transparency and re-usability in digital science publishing.

== Manuscript writing ==
A PubRef manuscript is a Markdown file within a container that contains extra embedded information that describes the essential front matter elements of a scholarly manuscript such as the title, short title, list of authors, author affiliations, key words. This information is captured in embedded YAML blocks within the primary manuscript called Meta. Figures, tables, equations and other special content can be similarly embedded within the context of the document via Meta descriptors.

== Minimal example ==
This minimal formatting example repurposes a classic paper by Stephen Hawking and Roger Penrose The Singularities of Gravitational Collapse and Cosmology:

# The journal meta descriptor declares what journal the 
# manuscript should be submitted to.
!journal
title: Proceedings of the Royal Society of London

# The article meta descriptor defines the title, keywords, and categorization
!article
type: Original Research
title: The Singularities of Gravitational Collapse and Cosmology

# A Meta Block that describes the corresponding author.
!author
corresponding: yes
first: Stephen
last: Hawking
degrees: PhD
affiliation: cambridge
---
!author
first: Roger
last: Penrose
degrees: PhD
affiliation: birbeck

# A Meta Block that describes an organizational affiliation.  
# The 'id' makes it referenceable within the document.
!affiliation id: cambridge
university: Cambridge University
institute: Institute of Theoretical Astronomy
---
!affiliation id: birbeck
college: Birbeck College
dept: Department of Mathematics

# Introduction

An important feature of gravitation, for very large concentrations of mass, is that it is essentially *unstable*. This is due...

# This inserts a bibliography within the document.  Citations references are 
# resolved to a items in a folder named 'references', in the same directory as the 
# manuscript file.
!bibliography 
src: references

== Manuscript publishing ==
Once the essential frontmatter meta elements have been declared, manuscripts can be automatically submitted to academic publishers. Articles, supporting data, and dependent code can be published directly on PubRef in the form of personal communications under the DOI prefix 10.17920/P9.pubref.
