= International Student Congress Of (bio)Medical Sciences =

International Student Congress Of (bio)Medical Sciences (ISCOMS)
- The official ISCOMS logo
- Venue: University Medical Center Groningen (UMCG)
- Locations: Groningen, Netherlands
- Country: The Netherlands
- Inaugurated: 1992
- Attendance: Presenting participants: 200–400; Non-presenting participants: 500–600
- Website: Official website

The International Student Congress Of (bio)Medical Sciences, also known as ISCOMS, is an annually held student congress on biomedical sciences. The primary aim of ISCOMS is getting medical students acquainted with research and its many elements.The 32nd edition of ISCOMS was held in June 2025 with 653 participants from 55 countries, while the 33rd edition of ISCOMS took take place from the 1st to the 4th of June, 2026.

== History ==
ISCOMS started as a congress for medical students in Groningen, named "Studenten Congres Geneeskunde". In 2003, the Student Congres Geneeskunde changed to an international congress with the name International Student Congress of Medicine. In 2004 the name was changed to ISCOMS. In 2010, the name was changed to the International Student Congress Of (bio)Medical Sciences, to show that it is a congress for students in all biomedical fields.

ISCOMS takes place at the University Medical Center Groningen (UMCG) in the Netherlands every year. It is one of the largest hospitals in the world, offering supraregional tertiary care to the northern part of the Netherlands. The medical center employs almost 17.000 people, numbers almost 1.400 beds and is affiliated with the University of Groningen.

== Congress structure ==
The congress is for (bio)medical students who are interested in research. Students may be either presenting or non-presenting participants. If a participant wants to present their research, they are required to submit their abstract beforehand. A strict selection procedure takes place and only the best students are invited to present their research at ISCOMS.

When accepted, participants are divided into different sessions in which they present their research. This may be either through a poster presentation, or an oral presentation where students can present their research using a slideshow presentation. In both sessions other students and professionals from the UMCG listen and discuss the research. Thirdly, there is a plenary session, during which the eight best abstracts will be presented in the primary lecture hall of the UMCG.

The congress also holds pre-course masterclasses about research skills, and a great variety of workshops during the congress days on practical skills. Besides that, ISCOMS offers keynote lectures from renowned scientists presenting their research to the participants.

== Nobel Prize laureates at ISCOMS ==
Nobel Prize laureates who have given a keynote lecture during one of the previous ISCOMS editions.

| ISCOMS year | Nobel Prize laureate | Research |
|---|---|---|
| 2024 | Brian Kobilka, Nobel Laureate 2012 | Structural insights into G protein coupled receptor activation |
| 2022 | Bruce Beutler, Nobel Laureate 2011 | From phenotypes to genes in immunity |
| 2021 | Peter J. Ratcliffe, Nobel Laureate 2019 | Understanding cellular oxygen sensing mechanisms: implications for medicine |
| 2019 | Mario R. Capecchi, Nobel Laureate 2007 | Mouse models of human disease from cancer to neuropsychiatric disorders |
| 2017 | Ben L. Feringa, Nobel Laureate 2017 | The development of multistage chiral catalysts |
| 2017 | Sir R.T. Hunt, Nobel Laureate 2001 | The discoveries of key regulators of the cell cycle |
| 2016 | Stefan W. Hell, Nobel Laureate 2014 | Overcoming Abbe's diffraction-limited resolution barrier in a light-focusing fluorescence microscope |
| 2015 | Martin Chalfie, Nobel Laureate 2008 | The discovery and development of the green fluorescent protein, GFP |
| 2014 | Ada E. Yonath, Nobel Laureate 2009 | Studies of the structure and function of the ribosome |
| 2012 | Mario Capecchi, Nobel Laureate 2007 | The discoveries of principles for introducing specific gene modifications in mice by the use of embryonic stem cells |
| 2011 | H. zur Hausen, Nobel Laureate 2008 | The discovery of human papilloma viruses causing cervical cancer |
| 2011 | Sir R.T. Hunt, Nobel Laureate 2001 | The discoveries of key regulators of the cell cycle |
| 2009 | Ferid Murad, Nobel Laureate 1998 | The discoveries concerning nitric oxide as a signalling molecule in the cardiovascular system |
| 2009 | Robin Warren, Nobel Laureate 2005 | The discovery of the bacterium Helicobacter pylori and its role in gastritis and peptic ulcer disease |
| 2008 | Gunter Blobel, Nobel Laureate 1999 | The prize for the discovery that proteins have intrinsic signals that govern their transport and localization in the cell |

== Other notable speakers at ISCOMS ==
- 2021 Ellen Roche
- 2022 Jeffrey M. Friedman, Karl Deisseroth
- 2023 Robert S. Langer, Maria Yazdanbakhsh
- 2025 Svetlana Mojsov
- 2026 Ben Feringa, Zhijian Chen, Ralf Bartenschlager, Maria Van Kerkhove

== Yearly themes ==
=== 2025 ===
The theme for the 2025 congress was ´Harmonious Healthcare´ focusing on global health challenges related to the environment, climate change, and conflict, with an emphasis on (future) collaboration between the so-called Global North and Global South. These concepts refer to the diverse socio-economic landscapes of our world. In the developing countries of the Global South, there is a young and dynamic population with great potential for innovative ideas. Meanwhile, the Global North has advanced technological knowledge, but its population is ageing. The core question is: how can these two worlds strengthen each other in a harmonious and beneficial way? Therefore, the aim is to approach these complex global issues with optimism to find solutions together. Harmonious Healthcare represents the alignment of various topics aimed at bringing together diverse backgrounds and talents.

=== 2026 ===
The 2026 congress was held under the theme "Breaking Biomedical Boundaries". Therefore, it highlighted the importance of innovation and how it can help to push the limits of the biomedical world through collaboration. More precisely, it aims to drive cross-disciplinary collaboration that includes diverse genders, cultures and nationalities.

== Organisational structure ==
The organisation of ISCOMS consists of (bio)medical students from the University of Groningen. There are nine Executive Board members and 25 committee members. Committees include the Scientific Programme, Sponsors & Fundraising, International Contacts, Hosting & Logistics, Media & Branding, and Research & Development.

== ISCOMS Research Fellowships (IRF) ==
ISCOMS also incorporates several projects. One such project is the ISCOMS Research Fellowships (IRF) which is unique in Europe and has become an integral part of the program. It provides students with an opportunity to pursue careers in medical sciences, expand their scientific networks, broaden their knowledge, and gain research experience. The program offers 30 students the opportunity to join a research group at the University Medical Center Groningen. During a two-week period, selected students work on individual research projects. For some participants, this may lead to an opportunity to undertake a long-term PhD project in Groningen.
