= Health Sciences Descriptors =

DeCS – Health Sciences Descriptors is a structured and trilingual thesaurus created by BIREME – Latin American and Caribbean Center on Health Sciences Information – in 1986 for indexing scientific journal articles, books, proceedings of congresses, technical reports and other types of materials, as well as for searching and recovering scientific information in LILACS, MEDLINE and other databases. In the VHL, Virtual Health Library, DeCS is the tool that permits the navigation between records and sources of information through controlled concepts and organized in Portuguese, Spanish and English.

It was developed from MeSH – Medical Subject Headings from the NLM – U.S. National Library of Medicine – in order to permit the use of common terminology for searching in three languages, providing a consistent and unique environment for information retrieval regardless of the language. In addition to the original MeSH terms, four specific areas were developed: Public Health (1986), Homeopathy (1991), Health Surveillance (2005), and Science and Health (2005).

The concepts that compose the DeCS vocabulary are organized in a hierarchical structure permitting searches in broader or more specific terms or all the terms that belong to a single hierarchy.

Its main purpose is to serve as a unique language for indexing and recovery of information among the components of the Latin American and Caribbean Health Sciences Information System, coordinated by BIREME and that encompasses 37 countries in Latin America and the Caribbean, permitting a uniform dialog between nearly 600 libraries.

DeCS participates in the unified terminology development project, UMLS – Unified Medical Language System of the NLM, with the responsibility of contributing with the terms in Portuguese and Spanish.
