= Biomedical sciences =

Application of science to healthcare

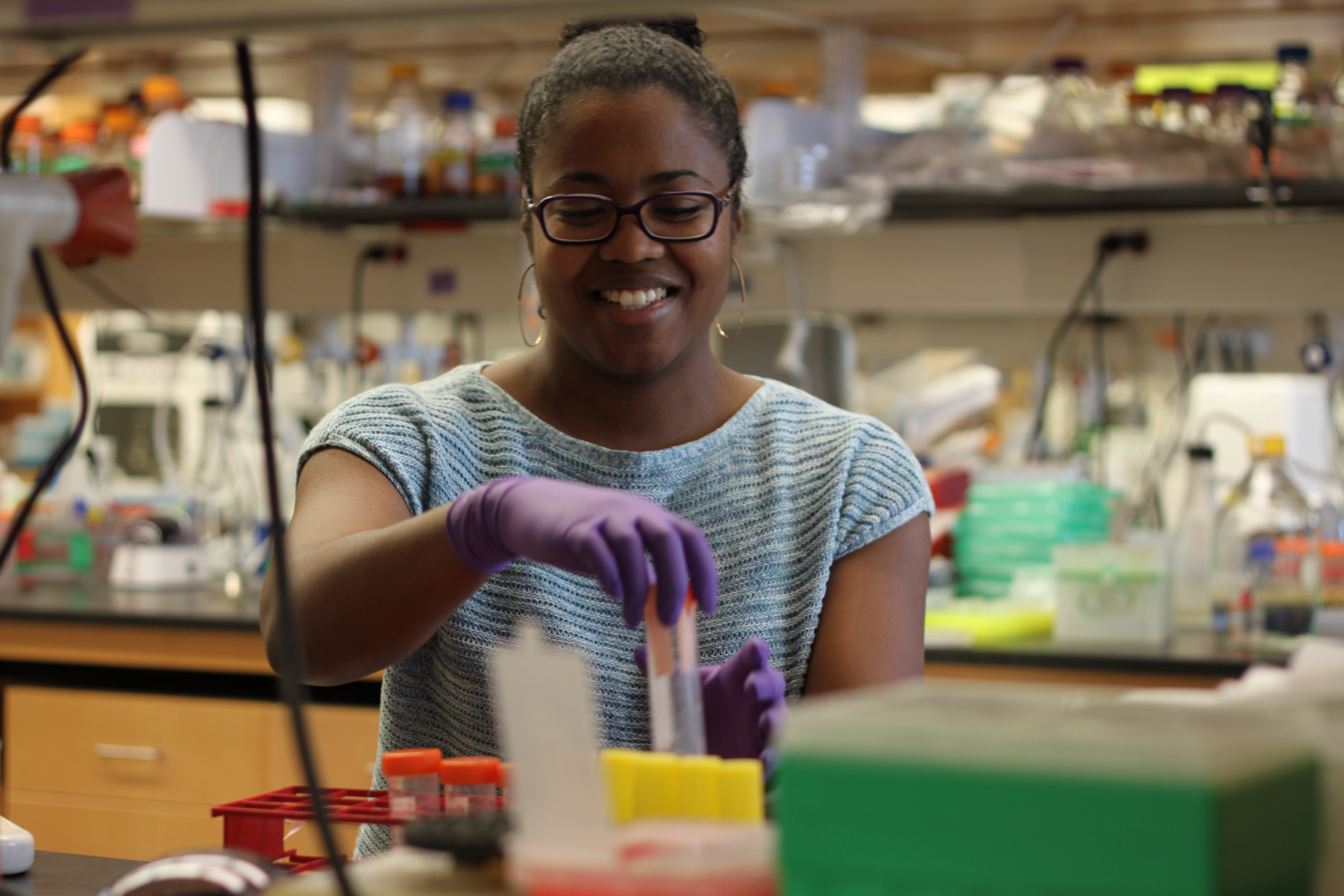
A biochemist engaged in bench research

Biomedical sciences are a set of sciences applying portions of natural science or formal science, or both, to develop knowledge, interventions, or technology that are of use in healthcare or public health. Such disciplines as medical microbiology, clinical virology, clinical epidemiology, genetic epidemiology, and biomedical engineering are medical sciences. In explaining physiological mechanisms operating in pathological processes, however, pathophysiology can be regarded as basic science.

Biomedical Sciences, as defined by the UK Quality Assurance Agency for Higher Education Benchmark Statement in 2015, includes those science disciplines whose primary focus is the biology of human health and disease and ranges from the generic study of biomedical sciences and human biology to more specialised subject areas such as pharmacology, human physiology and human nutrition. It is underpinned by relevant basic sciences including anatomy and physiology, cell biology, biochemistry, microbiology, genetics and molecular biology, pharmacology, immunology, mathematics and statistics, and bioinformatics. As such the biomedical sciences have a much wider range of academic and research activities and economic significance than that defined by hospital laboratory sciences. Biomedical Sciences are the major focus of bioscience research and funding in the 21st century.

== Roles within biomedical science ==
A sub-set of biomedical sciences is the science of clinical laboratory diagnosis. This is commonly referred to in the UK as 'biomedical science' or 'healthcare science'. There are at least 45 different specialisms within healthcare science, which are traditionally grouped into three main divisions:

- specialisms involving life sciences
- specialisms involving physiological science
- specialisms involving medical physics or bioengineering

== Life sciences specialties ==
- Molecular toxicology
- Molecular pathology
- Blood transfusion science
- Cervical cytology
- Clinical biochemistry
- Clinical embryology
- Clinical immunology
- Clinical pharmacology and therapeutics
- Electron microscopy
- External quality assurance
- Haematology
- Haemostasis and thrombosis
- Histocompatibility and immunogenetics
- Histopathology and cytopathology
- Molecular genetics and cytogenetics
- Molecular biology and cell biology
- Microbiology including mycology
- Bacteriology
- Tropical diseases
- Phlebotomy
- Tissue banking/transplant
- Virology

== Physiological science specialisms ==
- Audiology and hearing therapy
- Autonomic neurovascular function
- Cardiac physiology
- Clinical perfusion
- Critical care science
- Gastrointestinal physiology
- Neurophysiology
- Ophthalmic and vision science
- Respiratory and sleep physiology
- Urology
- Vascular science
- Pharmacology and Toxicology

== Physics and bioengineering specialisms ==
- Biomechanical engineering
- Biomedical engineering
- Clinical engineering
- Clinical measurement
- Diagnostic radiology
- Equipment management
- Maxillofacial prosthetics
- Medical electronics
- Medical engineering design
- Medical illustration and clinical photography
- Non-ionising radiation
- Nuclear medicine
- Radiopharmacy
- Radiation protection and monitoring
- Radiotherapy physics
- Rehabilitation engineering
- Renal technology and science
- Ultrasound

== Biomedical science in the United Kingdom ==
The healthcare science workforce is an important part of the UK's National Health Service. While people working in healthcare science are only 5% of the staff of the NHS, 80% of all diagnoses can be attributed to their work.

The volume of specialist healthcare science work is a significant part of the work of the NHS. Every year, NHS healthcare scientists carry out:

- nearly 1 billion pathology laboratory tests
- more than 12 million physiological tests
- support for 1.5 million fractions of radiotherapy

The four governments of the UK have recognised the importance of healthcare science to the NHS, introducing the Modernising Scientific Careers initiative to make certain that the education and training for healthcare scientists ensures there is the flexibility to meet patient needs while keeping up to date with scientific developments. Graduates of an accredited biomedical science degree programme can also apply for the NHS' Scientist training programme, which gives successful applicants an opportunity to work in a clinical setting whilst also studying towards an MSc or Doctoral qualification.

== Biomedical Science in Israel ==
In Israel, biomedical science is offered as an academic program at several major institutions, including the Hebrew University of Jerusalem, Tel Aviv University, the Technion – Israel Institute of Technology, and Ben-Gurion University of the Negev. These programs integrate coursework in molecular biology, genetics, biochemistry, physiology, and immunology with extensive laboratory training and research projects. Many faculty members involved in teaching are also active researchers or clinicians in affiliated hospitals and research centers, and students often participate in laboratory rotations, research internships, and collaborative projects with clinical departments.

Graduates commonly proceed to advanced degrees (M.Sc. or Ph.D.) in biomedical and life sciences, join research laboratories in universities, hospitals, biotechnology firms, or pharmaceutical companies, or use the degree as preparation for professional studies such as medicine, dentistry, pharmacy, or public health. In addition, many graduates work in the pharmaceutical and drug-development industry, contributing to preclinical research, diagnostic development, and translational projects. The close ties between universities and major medical centers provide opportunities for exposure to translational and clinical research throughout their studies.

== Biomedical Science in the 20th century ==
At this point in history the field of medicine was the most prevalent sub field of biomedical science, as several breakthroughs on how to treat diseases and help the immune system were made. As well as the birth of body augmentations.

=== 1910s ===
In 1912, the Institute of Biomedical Science was founded in the United Kingdom. The institute is still standing today and still regularly publishes works in the major breakthroughs in disease treatments and other breakthroughs in the field 117 years later. The IBMS today represents approximately 20,000 members employed mainly in National Health Service and private laboratories.

=== 1920s ===
In 1928, British Scientist Alexander Fleming discovered the first antibiotic penicillin. This was a huge breakthrough in biomedical science because it allowed for the treatment of bacterial infections.

In 1926, the first artificial pacemaker was made by Australian physician Dr. Mark C. Lidwell. This portable machine was plugged into a lighting point. One pole was applied to a skin pad soaked with strong salt solution, while the other consisted of a needle insulated up to the point and was plunged into the appropriate cardiac chamber and the machine started. A switch was incorporated to change the polarity. The pacemaker rate ranged from about 80 to 120 pulses per minute and the voltage also variable from 1.5 to 120 volts.

=== 1930s ===
The 1930s was a huge era for biomedical research, as this was the era where antibiotics became more widespread and vaccines started to be developed. In 1935, the idea of a polio vaccine was introduced by Dr. Maurice Brodie. Brodie prepared a died poliomyelitis vaccine, which he then tested on chimpanzees, himself, and several children. Brodie's vaccine trials went poorly since the polio-virus became active in many of the human test subjects. Many subjects had fatal side effects, paralyzing, and causing death.

=== 1940s ===
During and after World War II, the field of biomedical science saw a new age of technology and treatment methods. For instance in 1941 the first hormonal treatment for prostate cancer was implemented by Urologist and cancer researcher Charles B. Huggins. Huggins discovered that if you remove the testicles from a man with prostate cancer, the cancer had nowhere to spread, and nothing to feed on thus putting the subject into remission. This advancement lead to the development of hormonal blocking drugs, which is less invasive and still used today. At the tail end of this decade, the first bone marrow transplant was done on a mouse in 1949. The surgery was conducted by Dr. Leon O. Jacobson, he discovered that he could transplant bone marrow and spleen tissues in a mouse that had both no bone marrow and a destroyed spleen. The procedure is still used in modern medicine today and is responsible for saving countless lives.

=== 1950s ===
In the 1950s, we saw innovation in technology across all fields, but most importantly there were many breakthroughs which led to modern medicine. On 6 March 1953, Dr. Jonas Salk announced the completion of the first successful killed-virus Polio vaccine. The vaccine was tested on about 1.6 million Canadian, American, and Finnish children in 1954. The vaccine was announced as safe on 12 April 1955.

The 1950s saw foundational breakthroughs that reshaped modern molecular biology and clinical medicine. In 1953, James Watson and Francis Crick, drawing on the X-ray diffraction work of Rosalind Franklin and Maurice Wilkins, deduced the double-helix structure of DNA. In December 1953 at the Brigham Hospital in Boston, Dr. Joseph Murray performed the first successful human kidney transplant between identical twins. By 1958, Rune Elmqvist and Ake Senning developed and implanted the first fully internal cardiac pacemaker.

=== 1960s ===
The 1960s marked significant progress in immunology, molecular biology, and organ transplantation. In 1961, Marshall Nirenberg and Heinrich Matthaei deciphered the first codon of the genetic code, paving the way for understanding how cellular machinery translates genetic information into proteins. In 1967, South African surgeon Christiaan Barnard performed the first successful human-to-human heart transplant, demonstrating the feasibility of major organ replacement despite early challenges with tissue rejection.

=== 1970s ===
Recombinant DNA technology emerged in the 1970s, fundamentally transforming biomedical research. In 1972 and 1973, Paul Berg, Herbert Boyer, and Stanley Cohen developed techniques to cut and splice DNA molecules from different organisms, establishing the foundation of modern biotechnology. In 1975, Georges Kohler and Cesar Milstein developed hybridoma technology to produce monoclonal antibodies, creating highly specific tools for diagnostic assays and targeted therapies. The late 1970s also witnessed major public health milestones, including the global eradication of smallpox, certified by the World Health Organization in 1979, and the introduction of Fred Sanger's DNA sequencing method in 1977.

=== 1980s ===
Biomedical research in the 1980s was characterized by rapid advances in molecular diagnostics and genetic engineering. In 1983, Kary Mullis invented the Polymerase Chain Reaction (PCR), a technique that enabled the exponential amplification of specific DNA sequences. PCR revolutionized medical diagnostics, forensic science, and molecular genetics. The decade was also defined by the biomedical response to the HIV/AIDS epidemic following the identification of the human immunodeficiency virus in 1983 and 1984 by Luc Montagnier, Françoise Barré-Sinoussi and Robert Gallo. Additionally, recombinant human insulin, approved in 1982, became the first commercially available medication produced through recombinant DNA technology.

=== 1990s ===
The 1990s laid the groundwork for genomics and regenerative medicine. In 1990, the international Human Genome Project was officially launched with the goal of mapping and sequencing the entire human genome. The same year marked the first approved human gene therapy clinical trial, conducted by W. French Anderson to treat severe combined immunodeficiency (SCID). In 1996, researchers led by Ian Wilmut successfully cloned the first mammal from an adult somatic cell, Dolly the sheep. Shortly thereafter, in 1998, James Thomson isolated human embryonic stem cells, opening new avenues for regenerative medicine and tissue engineering.

=== 2000s ===
The early 21st century signaled the beginning of the genomic era in biomedical science. In 2003, the Human Genome Project announced the successful completion of the human genome sequence, enabling high-throughput genomic studies and personalized medicine strategies. In 2006, Shinya Yamanaka discovered induced pluripotent stem cells (iPSCs), demonstrating that mature adult cells could be reprogrammed back into a stem cell-like state without requiring embryonic tissue. The decade also saw the widespread adoption of targeted cancer therapies, such as imatinib (Gleevec), which specifically targeted molecular drivers of malignancy rather than relying solely on conventional chemotherapy.

=== 2010s ===
The 2010s were defined by advances in precision genome editing and structural biology. In 2012, Jennifer Doudna and Emmanuelle Charpentier adapted the bacterial CRISPR-Cas9 defense system into a programmable gene-editing tool, revolutionizing genetic engineering and translational medicine. Additionally, immunotherapy emerged as a dominant paradigm in oncology, highlighted by the development and clinical approval of CAR-T cell therapies and immune checkpoint inhibitors.

=== 2020s ===
The biomedical response to the COVID-19 pandemic highlighted the rapid translation of advanced platform technologies into clinical practice. The development and deployment of mRNA-based vaccines against SARS-CoV-2 demonstrated the efficacy of nucleic acid therapeutics at a global scale. The 2020s also marked major integration of artificial intelligence into biomedical sciences, exemplified by deep-learning models such as AlphaFold for high-accuracy protein structure prediction, accelerating drug discovery and biological analysis.

== See also ==
- Academic health science centre
- Biomedical research
- Biomedical technology
- Health Sciences Descriptors
- Healthcare science
- International Student Congress Of (bio)Medical Sciences
- Medical diagnosis
- Medical laboratory
- Medical scientist
- Public health
- Publicly funded health care
- Biomedical research institution Austral University Hospital
