= PubMed Central =

Repository of freely accessible biomedical journal articles

- Producer: United States National Library of Medicine (United States)
- History: 2000–present

Access
- Cost: Free

Coverage
- Disciplines: Medicine
- Record depth: Index, abstract & full-text
- Format coverage: Journal articles
- No. of records: 10,800,000

Links
- Website: pmc.ncbi.nlm.nih.gov
- Title list(s): pmc.ncbi.nlm.nih.gov/journals/

PubMed Central (PMC) is a free digital repository that archives open access full-text scholarly articles that have been published in biomedical and life sciences journals. As one of the major research databases developed by the National Center for Biotechnology Information (NCBI), PubMed Central is more than a document repository. Submissions to PMC are indexed and formatted for enhanced metadata, medical ontology, and unique identifiers which enrich the XML structured data for each article. Content within PMC can be linked to other NCBI databases and accessed via Entrez search and retrieval systems, further enhancing the public's ability to discover, read and build upon its biomedical knowledge.

PubMed Central is distinct from PubMed. PubMed Central is a free digital archive of full articles, accessible to anyone from anywhere via a web browser (with varying provisions for reuse). Conversely, although PubMed is a searchable database of biomedical citations and abstracts, the full-text article resides elsewhere (in print or online, free or behind a subscriber paywall).

== History ==
PubMed Central began as E-biomed, initially proposed in May 1999 by then-NIH director Harold Varmus. The idea came to him "abruptly" in December 1998, inspired by the early use of arXiv for preprints after a presentation from Pat Brown of Stanford and David Lipman, director of NCBI:

But my views broadened abruptly one morning in December 1998 when I met Pat Brown for coffee, at the café that was formerly the famed Tassajara Bakery, on the corner of Cole and Parnassus, during a visit to San Francisco. [...] A few weeks before our coffee, Pat had learned about the methods being used by the physicist Paul Ginsparg and his colleagues at Los Alamos to allow physicists and mathematicians to share their work with one another over the Internet. They were posting "preprints" (articles not yet submitted or accepted for publication) at a publicly accessible website (called LanX or arXiv) for anyone to read and critique. [...] The more I thought about this, the more I was convinced that a radical restructuring of methods for publishing, transmitting, storing, and using biomedical research reports might be possible and beneficial. In a spirit of enthusiasm and political innocence, I wrote a lengthy manifesto, proposing the creation of an NIH-supported online system, called E-biomed.

The goal of E-biomed was to provide free access to all biomedical research. Papers submitted to E-biomed could take one of two routes: either immediately published as a preprint, or through a traditional peer review process. The peer review process was to resemble contemporary overlay journals, with an external editorial board retaining control over the process of reviewing, curating, and listing papers which would otherwise be freely accessible on the central E-biomed server. Varmus intended to realize the new possibilities presented by communicating scientific results digitally, imagining continuous conversation about published work, versioned documents, and enriched "layered" formats allowing for multiple levels of detail.

The proposal to create a central index of biomedical research was a radical departure from prevailing publishing norms. Prior to the internet, publication indexes operated largely like ISBNs: allocated by registration agencies to secondary publishers. The idea that anyone could own their own address space via a domain name and create their own indexing system was a wholly new idea. Major commercial publishers had begun experimenting with an indexing system for scientific papers shared across publishers as early as 1993, and were spurred to action following the E-biomed proposal. At the October 1999 STM Annual Frankfurt Conference, several publishers led by Springer-Verlag reached a hurried conference room consensus to launch their competitor prototype:

At the Board meeting of the STM association, held the afternoon of Monday, October 11, before the fair's Wednesday opening, discussion focused on an emerging U.S. National Library of Medicine (NLM) initiative called E-Biomed (later PubMed Central) that had been proposed by Harold Varmus of the National Institutes of Health in the spring of 1999. Varmus envisioned a digital archive of journals, accessible free of charge and with the added value of reference linking. "Our consensus was that publishers should be the ones doing the linking," said Bob Campbell, who chaired the meeting. "Since we were 'higher up the stream,' so to speak, we should be able to link our articles ahead of the NLM as part of the process of producing them. Stefan von Holtzbrinck then set the ball rolling by offering to link Nature publications with anyone else's. We decided to issue an announcement of a broad STM reference linking initiative. It was, of course, a strategic move only, since we had neither plan nor prototype."

A small group led by Arnoud de Kemp of Springer-Verlag met in an adjacent room immediately following the Board meeting to draft the announcement, which was distributed to all attendees of the STM annual meeting the following day and published in an STM membership publication. [...] The potential benefit of the service that would become CrossRef was immediately apparent. Organizations such as AIP and IOP (Institute of Physics) had begun to link to each other's publications, and the impossibility of replicating such one-off arrangements across the industry was obvious. As Tim Ingoldsby later put it, "All those linking agreements were going to kill us."

Under pressure from vigorous lobbying from commercial publishers and scientific societies who feared for lost profits, NIH officials announced a revised PubMed Central proposal in August 1999. PMC would receive submissions from publishers, rather than from authors as in E-biomed. Publications were allowed time-embargoed paywalls up to one year. PMC would only allow peer-reviewed work—no preprints. The then-unnamed publisher-led linking system shortly thereafter became CrossRef and the larger DOI system. Varmus, Brown, and others including Michael Eisen went on to found the Public Library of Science (PLoS) in 2001, reaching the conclusion "that if we really want to change the publication of scientific research, we must do the publishing ourselves."

== Adoption ==
Launched in February 2000, the repository has grown rapidly as the NIH Public Access Policy is designed to make all research funded by the National Institutes of Health (NIH) freely accessible to anyone, and, in addition, many publishers are working cooperatively with the NIH to provide free access to their works. In late 2007, the Consolidated Appropriations Act of 2008 (H.R. 2764) was signed into law and included a provision requiring the NIH to modify its policies and require inclusion into PubMed Central complete electronic copies of their peer-reviewed research and findings from NIH-funded research. These articles are required to be included within 12 months of publication. This is the first time the US government has required an agency to provide open access to research and is an evolution from the 2005 policy, in which the NIH asked researchers to voluntarily add their research to PubMed Central.

A UK version of the PubMed Central system, UK PubMed Central (UKPMC), has been developed by the Wellcome Trust and the British Library as part of a nine-strong group of UK research funders. This system went live in January 2007. On 1 November 2012, it became Europe PubMed Central. The Canadian member of the PubMed Central International network, PubMed Central Canada, was launched in October 2009.

The National Library of Medicine "NLM Journal Publishing Tag Set" journal article markup language is freely available. The Association of Learned and Professional Society Publishers comments that "it is likely to become the standard for preparing scholarly content for both books and journals". A related DTD is available for books. The Library of Congress and the British Library have announced support for the NLM DTD. It has also been popular with journal service providers.

With the release of public access plans for many agencies beyond NIH, PMC is in the process of becoming the repository for a wider variety of articles. This includes NASA content, with the interface branded as "PubSpace".

As of December 2018, the PMC archive contained over 5.2 million articles, with contributions coming from publishers or authors depositing their manuscripts into the repository per the NIH Public Access Policy. Earlier data shows that from January 2013 to January 2014 author-initiated deposits exceeded 103,000 papers during a 12-month period. PMC identifies about 4,000 journals which participate in some capacity to deposit their published content into the PMC repository. Some publishers delay the release of their articles on PubMed Central for a set time after publication, referred to as an "embargo period", ranging from a few months to a few years depending on the journal. (Embargoes of six to twelve months are the most common.) PubMed Central is a key example of "systematic external distribution by a third party", which some publishers purport to prohibit through private contracts.

== Technology ==
Articles are sent to PubMed Central by publishers in XML or SGML, using a variety of article DTDs. Older and larger publishers may have their own established in-house DTDs, but many publishers use the NLM Journal Publishing DTD (see above).

Received articles are converted via XSLT to the very similar NLM Archiving and Interchange DTD. This process may reveal errors that are reported back to the publisher for correction. Graphics are also converted to standard formats and sizes. The original and converted forms are archived. The converted form is moved into a relational database, along with associated files for graphics, multimedia, or other associated data. Many publishers also provide PDF of their articles, and these are made available without change.

Bibliographic citations are parsed and automatically linked to the relevant abstracts in PubMed, articles in PubMed Central, and resources on publishers' Web sites. PubMed links also lead to PubMed Central. Unresolvable references, such as to journals or particular articles not yet available at one of these sources, are tracked in the database and automatically come "live" when the resources become available.

An in-house indexing system provides search capability, and is aware of biological and medical terminology, such as generic vs. proprietary drug names, and alternate names for organisms, diseases and anatomical parts.

When a user accesses a journal issue, a table of contents is automatically generated by retrieving all articles, letters, editorials, etc. for that issue. When an actual item such as an article is reached, PubMed Central converts the NLM markup to HTML for delivery, and provides links to related data objects. This is feasible because the variety of incoming data has first been converted to standard DTDs and graphic formats.

In a separate submission stream, NIH-funded authors may deposit articles into PubMed Central using the NIH Manuscript Submission (NIHMS). Articles thus submitted typically go through XML markup in order to be converted to NLM DTD.

== Reception ==
Reactions to PubMed Central among the scholarly publishing community range between a genuine enthusiasm by some, to cautious concern by others.

While PMC is a welcome partner to open access publishers in its ability to augment the discovery and dissemination of biomedical knowledge, that same truth causes others to worry about traffic being diverted from the published version of record, the economic consequences of less readership, as well as the effect on maintaining a community of scholars within learned societies. A 2013 analysis found strong evidence that public repositories of published articles were responsible for "drawing significant numbers of readers away from journal websites" and that "the effect of PMC is growing over time".

The Antelman study of open access publishing found that in philosophy, political science, electrical and electronic engineering and mathematics, open access papers had a greater research impact. A randomised trial found an increase in content downloads of open access papers, with no citation advantage over subscription access one year after publication.

The NIH policy and open access repository work has inspired a 2013 presidential directive which has sparked action in other federal agencies as well.

In March 2020, PubMed Central accelerated its deposit procedures for the full text of publications on coronavirus. The NLM did so upon request from the White House Office of Science and Technology Policy and international scientists to improve access for scientists, healthcare providers, data mining innovators, AI healthcare researchers, and the general public.

== PMCID ==
The PMCID (PubMed Central identifier), also known as the PMC reference number, is a bibliographic identifier for the PubMed Central open access database, much like the PMID is the bibliographic identifier for the PubMed database. The two identifiers are distinct however. It consists of "PMC" followed by a string of numbers. The format is:

- PMCID: PMC1852221

Authors applying for NIH awards must include the PMCID in their application.

== See also ==
- Europe PubMed Central
- JATS (technology)
- MEDLINE, an international literature database of life sciences and biomedical information
- PMID (PubMed Identifier)
- PubMed Central Canada
- Redalyc (similar project focused on Latin America)
- SciELO (similar service)
