= Xeditor =

Web-based XML editor

- Developer: Fabasoft Xpublisher GmbH
- Type: XML editor
- License: Proprietary
- Website: www.fabasoft.com/de/on-proceco/xpublisher/use-cases/xeditor-xml-editor

Xeditor is a web-based XML editor with a WYSIWYG interface. It hides the XML-code in the background and presents the content in a more user-friendly format. The frontend is similar to Microsoft Word.

The editor supports certain XML standards (DITA / DocBook / S1000D / TEI / JATS). Using WIRIS, the author can edit and display mathematical formulas in MathML. The JavaScript architecture is based on ExtJS.

== Use and features ==
During data entry, the XML document structure is monitored on a continuous basis. The author may only execute actions that are valid at the corresponding positions. The validation is based on mapping of XSD / DTD / RELAX NG, Schematron. All content modifications by authors are independently tracked and can be analyzed for final editing. Xeditor supports comments being added regarding individual text passages. Remarks and corrections can be directly entered and saved in the document without interrupting the text. Xeditor is web based, without requiring further plug-ins and installations. Xeditor can be integrated into existing systems such as CMS, DMS, PIM, DAM and other relational databases.

== Awards ==
Winner of the EDP Awards 2013/2014 in the category "Best design/layout/editorial solution".
Winner of BEST OF 2015 Innovationspreis-IT in the category "Content Management". Winner of BEST OF 2016 Innovationspreis-IT in the category "Content Management". One of Econtent Trendsetting Products 2016.
