= Karen Lillycrop =

British professor of Epigenetics

- Born: Karen Ann Lillycrop
- Died: 2024
- Education: Imperial College London, University of Leicester
- Known for: Research into epigenetic mechanisms and the developmental origins of health and disease
- Awards: Nick Hales Award for outstanding contribution to the developmental origins of health and disease
- Scientific career
- Fields: Biomedical Sciences, Epigenetics, Agricultural Sciences
- Workplaces: University of Southampton

Karen Ann Lillycrop is a British geneticist. She is professor of Epigenetics at the University of Southampton. She is listed as a notable scientist in Thomson Reuters' Highly Cited Researchers 2014, ranking her among the top 1% most cited scientists.

== Early life ==
Lillycrop obtained a Bachelor of Science degree (BSc, Joint Hons) in Chemistry and Biochemistry at Imperial College London. She then obtained a Doctorate in Biochemistry at the University of Leicester.

== Career ==
Lillycrop undertook post-doctoral research at University College London in Professor David Latchman's laboratory where she studied regulation of gene expression and the role of transcription factors in disease.

In 1995, Lillycrop took up a lectureship in Molecular Biology at the University of Southampton,. Her early research in Southampton focused on the influence of early life environment on the epigenetic regulation of genes and the development of human disease. Lillycrop collaborated with Dr. Graham Burdge (also at Southampton) to demonstrate for the first time that pregnant women's diets can affect the epigenetic regulation of key transcription factors within the foetus.

In 2007, Lillycrop was appointed Professor of Epigenetics at the University of Southampton.

Lillycrop co-founded the Epigen consortium, an international consortium which investigates the role of epigenetic processes in the developmental origins of disease.

== Publications ==
=== Books ===
- 2014 Hoile, S.P., Lillycrop, K.A., Grenfell, Leonie R., Hanson, M.A. and Burdge, G.C. Phenotypic and epigenetic inheritance across multiple generations in mammals through the female line. Tollesfsbol, Trygve O (ed.) Transgenerational Epigenetics: Evidence and Debate. Philadelphia, US, Elsevier, 269-277.
- 2012 Laphm, A.S., Lillycrop, K.A., Burdge, G.C., Gluckman, P.D., Hanson, M.A. and Godfrey, K.M. Epigenetic approaches to control obesity. Tollefsbol, T. (ed.) Epigenetics in Human Disease. Kidlington, GB, Academic Press, 297-320.
- 2011 Lillycrop, Karen A., Hanson, Mark A. and Burdge, Graham C. The effect of maternal macronutrient intake on phenotype induction. Niculescu, Mihai and Haggarty, Paul (eds.) Nutrition in Epigenetics. Chichester, GB, Wiley, 275-285.
- 2011 Godfrey, K.M., Lillycrop, K.A., Hanson, M.A. and Burdge, G.C. Epigenetic mechanisms in the developmental origins of adult disease. Roach, Helmtrud I., Bronner, Felix and Oreffo, Richard O.C. (eds.) Epigenetic Aspects of Chronic Diseases. Heidelberg, DE, Springer.
- 2010 Jackson, Alan A., Burdge, Graham C. and Lillycrop, Karen A. Diet, nutrition and modulation of genomic expression in fetal origins of adult disease. Simopoulos, A.P. and Milner, J.A. (eds.) Personalized Nutrition; Karger, 56-72. (World Reviews in Nutrition and Dietetics, 101).

=== Recent articles ===
- 2014 Hoile, Samuel P., Clarke-Harris, R., Huang, R.C., Calder, P.C., Mori, T.A., Beilin, L.J., Lillycrop, Karen A. and Burdge, Graham C. Supplementation with n-3 long-chain polyunsaturated fatty acids or olive oil in men and women with renal disease induces differential changes in the DNA methylation of FADS2 and ELOVL5 in peripheral blood mononuclear cells. PLoS ONE, 9, (10), e109896.
- 2014 Clarke-Harris, Rebecca, Wilkin, Terrence, Hosking, Joanna, Pinkney, Jonathan, Jeffery, Alison, Metcalf, Brad, Godfrey, Keith, Voss, Linda, Lillycrop, Karen and Burdge, Graham Peroxisomal proliferator activated receptor-γ-co-activator-1α promoter methylation in blood at 5–7 years predicts adiposity from 9 to 14 years (EarlyBird 50). Diabetes, 63, (7), 2528-2537.
- 2014 Poore, Kirsten R., Hollis, Lisa J., Murray, Robert J.S., Warlow, Anna, Brewin, Andrew, Fulford, Laurence, Cleal, Jane K., Lillycrop, Karen A., Burdge, Graham C., Hanson, Mark A. and Green, Lucy R. Differential pathways to adult metabolic dysfunction following poor nutrition at two critical developmental periods in sheep. PLoS ONE, 9, (3), 1-13.
- 2014 Burdge, Graham C. and Lillycrop, Karen A. Fatty acids and epigenetics. Current Opinion in Nutrition and Metabolic Care, 17, (2), 156-161.
- 2014 Burdge, Graham C. and Lillycrop, Karen A. Environment-physiology, diet quality and energy balance: the influence of early life nutrition on future energy balance. Physiology & Behavior (doi:10.1016/j.physbeh.2013.12.007).
- 2014 Sibbons, Charlene, Brenna, J. Thomas, Lawrence, Peter, Hoile, Samuel, Clarke-Harris, Rebecca, Lillycrop, Karen and Burdge, Graham Effect of sex hormones on n-3 polyunsaturated fatty acid biosynthesis in HepG2 cells and in human primary hepatocytes. Prostaglandins, Leukotrienes and Essential Fatty Aacids, 90, (2-3), 47-54.
- 2013 Krause, B., Costello, P.M., Munoz-Urrutia, E., Lillycrop, Karen A., Hanson, Mark A. and Casanello, P. Role of DNA methyltransferase 1 on the altered eNOS expression in human umbilical endothelium from intrauterine growth restricted fetuses. Epigenetics, 8, (9), 944-952.
- 2013 Harvey, N.C., Sheppard, A., Godfrey, K.M., McLean, C., Garratt, Emma, Ntani, G., Davies, L., Murray, R., Inskip, H.M., Gluckman, P.D., Hanson, M.A., Lillycrop, K.A. and Cooper, C. Childhood bone mineral content is associated with methylation status of the RXRA promoter at birth. Journal of Bone and Mineral Research.

== Recognition ==
- 2008: Awarded UK patent number 2650443 for Phenotype derivatives.
- 2007: Nick Hales Award for outstanding contribution to the developmental origins of health and disease.
