= Tom Lillycrop =

English rugby league footballer

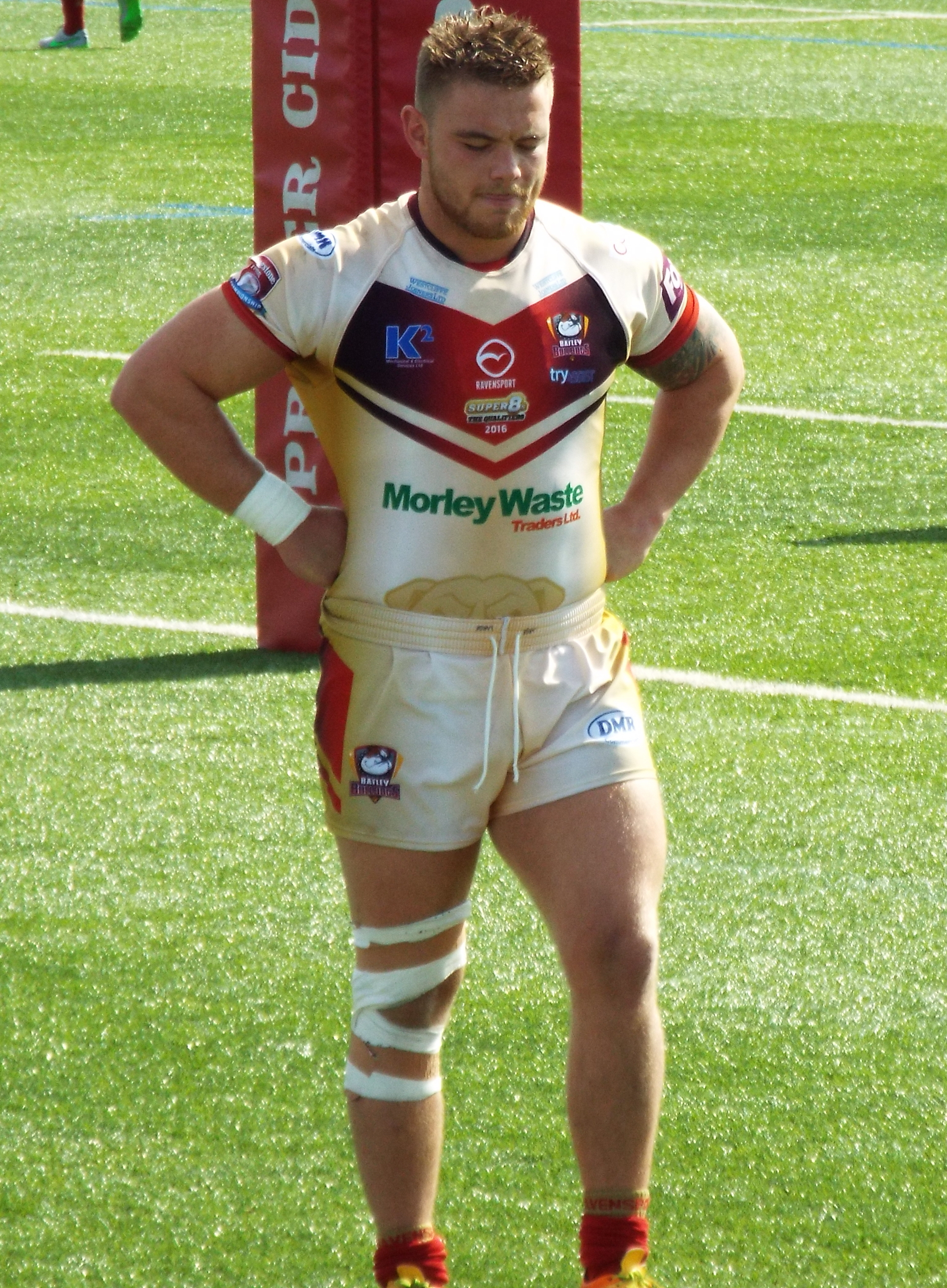

Personal information
- Full name: Thomas Lillycrop
- Born: 29 November 1991 (age 34)
- Height: 5 ft 11 in (1.80 m)
- Weight: 17 st 6 lb (111 kg)

Playing information

Rugby league
- Position: Prop
Club
Years	Team	Pld	T	G	FG	P
2013	Dewsbury Rams	23	0	0	0	0
2014	Sheffield Eagles	24	0	0	0	0
2015–19	Batley Bulldogs	85	9	0	0	36
2020–	Batley Bulldogs	17	0	0	0	0
	Total	149	9	0	0	36

Rugby union
Club
Years	Team	Pld	T	G	FG	P
2019–20	Cleckheaton RUFC		0	0	0	0
- Source: As of 5 January 2023

Thomas Lillycrop (born 29 November 1991) is a professional rugby league footballer who plays as prop for the Batley Bulldogs in the Championship.

== Club career ==
=== Rugby League ===
Lillycrop has previously played for the Dewsbury Rams and Sheffield Eagles in the Championship.

=== Rugby Union ===
On 24 October 2019 it was reported that Lillcrop had switched codes to join Cleckheaton RUFC.
