= PubMed Central Canada =

Canadian national digital repository

PubMed Central Canada (PMC Canada) was a Canadian national digital repository of peer-reviewed health and life sciences literature. It operated from 2010 to 2018. It joined Europe PubMed Central (formerly UK PubMed Central) as a member of the PubMed Central International network. PMC Canada was a partnership between the Canadian Institutes of Health Research (CIHR), the Canada Institute for Scientific and Technical Information (NRC-CISTI, the Canadian National Science Library), and the United States National Library of Medicine (NLM).

PMC Canada included an interface in both English and French, to support the use of Canada's two official languages. PubMed Central Canada provided free access to content, and was one of the locations where CIHR researchers could deposit their peer-reviewed research articles, in order to meet with the open-access requirements of the CIHR Policy on Access to Research Outputs.

== Launch ==
The initial version of PubMed Central Canada launched in October 2009. The launch was timed to coincide with Open Access Week. The full launch of PMC Canada, including a manuscript submission system for CIHR researchers, was April 28, 2010.

== Taken offline ==
On February 23, 2018, PubMed Central Canada (PMC Canada) was taken offline permanently. No author manuscripts were deleted, and the approximately 2,900 manuscripts authored by researchers funded by the Canadian Institutes of Health Research (CIHR) in the archive were copied to the National Research Council's Digital Repository over the coming months. These manuscripts along with all other content will also remain publicly searchable on PubMed Central and Europe PubMed Central, meaning such manuscripts will continue to be compliant with the Tri-Agency Open Access Policy on Publications.
