= Virtual Health Library =

Health institution that employs the World Wide Web

Logo

The Virtual Health Library (VHL) (Biblioteca Virtual en Salud, BVS) is an institution that employs the World Wide Web to "improve access to reliable, locally relevant information [on health and health sciences] for health-professionals, researchers, academics, educators, decision-makers, and the general public". BVSes are organized under the auspices of the Pan-American Health Organization and the World Health Organization.

VHL is a digital library and common space for the convergence of the cooperative work of producers, intermediaries, and users of information on healthcare science, built and developed by the Latin American and Caribbean Center on Health Sciences Information (also known as BIREME) in 1998. The VHL promotes the development of a network of sources of scientific and technical information with universal access to the internet.

BIREME has envisioned the VHL as a new model for the management of information and knowledge, which includes the cooperation and convergence between institutions, systems, networks, and initiatives of producers, intermediaries, and users in the operation of networks of local, national, regional and international information sources favoring open and universal access.

Today, every country in Latin America and the Caribbean regions participates either directly or indirectly in the cooperative products and services offered by the VHL, which includes over 1,000 institutions in more than 30 countries.

The VHL is simulated in a virtual space of the internet formed by a collection or network of health information sources in the region. Users of different levels and locations can interact and navigate in the space of one or many information sources, regardless of where they are. Information sources are generated, updated, stored and operated on the internet by producers, integrators, and intermediaries, in a decentralized manner, following common methodologies for their integration in the VHL.

The VHL organizes information in a structure that integrates and interconnects literature databases, directories or experts, events and institutions, a catalogue of the information resources available on the internet, collections of full texts with a highlight for the SciELO (Scientific Electronic Library Online) collection of scientific journals, selective information dissemination services, information sources to support education and decision-making, news, discussion lists, and support to virtual communities. The space of the VHL is, therefore, a dynamic and decentralized network of information sources based on which it is possible to retrieve and extract information and knowledge to support health decision-making processes.

The Virtual Health Library can be visualized as a distributed base of scientific and technical health knowledge that is saved, organized and stored in electronic format in the countries of the region, universally accessible on the internet and compatible with international databases.

== See also ==
- Health Sciences Descriptors
