= Latin American and Caribbean Center on Health Sciences Information =

Medical library in São Paulo, Brazil

- Established: 1967

Other information
- Website: Official website

The Latin American and Caribbean Center on Health Sciences Information or BIREME was founded in São Paulo in 1967 as the Biblioteca Regional de Medicina, a specialized center of the Pan-American Health Organization (PAHO) / World Health Organization (WHO).

BIREME coordinates the development of the Virtual Health Library model which includes access to around 30 million references to scientific and technical literature in the four official languages of Latin America and the Caribbean.

== Description ==
The center is located on the campus of the Universidade Federal de São Paulo – Unifesp (Federal University of São Paulo). Since its foundation in 1967, BIREME is established by an agreement between PAHO, the Brazilian Ministry of Health, the Brazilian Ministry of Education, the Secretary of Health of the State of São Paulo, and Unifesp. Since 2009, the agreement coexists with the process of implementation of the new legal statute approved by the 49th Directing Council of PAHO.

BIREME has met the growing demand for up-to-date scientific literature from the Brazilian health systems and the communities of healthcare researchers, professionals and students. In 1982, its name changed to the current Latin American and Caribbean Center on Health Sciences Information, as to better express its dedication to the strengthening and expansion of the flow of scientific and technical health information across the region, but it kept the acronym.

Networking, based on decentralization, the development of local capacities, the sharing of information resources, developing cooperative products and services, and designing common methodologies, has been the foundation of BIREME's technical cooperation work. The center established itself as an international model that fosters professional education through managerial and technical information and the adoption of information and communication paradigms that best meet local needs.

The main objectives which support the existence of BIREME are the following:

- providing access to scientific and technical health information for the development of health;
- developing the capacity of Latin American and Caribbean countries and the uptake of scientific and technical health information in a cooperative and efficient manner;
- responding to demands for scientific and technical health information from governments, health systems, and educational and research institutions.

== Activities ==
BIREME, as a specialized center of PAHO/WHO, coordinates and conducts technical cooperation activities on the management of scientific information and knowledge with the aim of strengthening and expanding the flow of scientific health information in Brazil and in other Latin American and Caribbean countries as a key condition for the development of health, including its planning, management, promotion, research, education, and care.

The Virtual Health Library (VHL) is the main model of this technical cooperation as a common space for the convergence of the cooperative work of producers, intermediaries, and users of health information.

== See also ==
- Literatura Latino-Americana e do Caribe em Ciências da Saúde (LILACS)
- SciELO
- Latin American Bibliography
