= Europe PubMed Central =

Database of biomedical research

Europe PubMed Central (Europe PMC)
Content
- Description: Europe PMC: a full-text literature database for the life sciences and platform for innovation

Contact
- Research center: European Bioinformatics Institute
- Authors: Europe PMC Consortium
- Primary citation: Europe PMC Consortium (2015)
- Release date: 2007

Access
- Website: europepmc.org

Europe PubMed Central (Europe PMC) is an open-access repository that contains millions of biomedical research works. It was known as UK PubMed Central until 1 November 2012.

== Service ==
Europe PMC provides free access to more than 9.3 million full-text biomedical and life sciences research articles and over 43.3 million citations. Europe PMC contains some citation information and includes text mining based marked up text that links to external molecular and medical datasets. The Europe PMC funders group requires that articles describing the results of biomedical and life sciences research they have supported be made freely available in Europe PMC within 6 months of publication to maximise the impact of the work that they fund.

The Grant Lookup facility allows users to search for information in a wide variety of different ways on over 101,900 grants awarded by the Europe PMC funders.

Most content is mirrored from PubMed Central, which manages the deposit of entire books and journals. Additionally, Europe PMC offers a manuscript submission system, Europe PMC plus, which allows scientists to self-deposit their peer-reviewed research articles for inclusion in the Europe PMC collection.

== Organisation ==
The Europe PMC project was originally launched in 2007 as the first 'mirror' site to PMC, which aims to provide international preservation of the open and free-access biomedical and life sciences literature. It forms part of a network of PMC International (PMCI) repositories that includes PubMed Central Canada. Europe PMC is not an exact "mirror" of the PMC database but has developed some different features. On 15 February 2013 CiteXplore was subsumed under Europe PubMed Central.

The resource is managed and developed by the European Molecular Biology Laboratory-European Bioinformatics Institute (EMBL-EBI), on behalf of an alliance of 27 biomedical and life sciences research funders, led by the Wellcome Trust.

Europe PMC is supported by 27 organisations: Academy of Medical Sciences, Action on Hearing Loss, Alzheimer's Society, Arthritis Research UK, Austrian Science Fund (FWF), the Biotechnology and Biological Sciences Research Council, Blood Cancer UK, Breast Cancer Now, the British Heart Foundation, Cancer Research UK, the Chief Scientist Office of the Scottish Executive Health Department, Diabetes UK, the Department of Health, the Dunhill Medical Trust, the European Research Council, Marie Curie, the Medical Research Council, the Motor Neurone Disease Association, the Multiple Sclerosis Society, the Myrovlytis Trust, the National Centre for the Replacement, Refinement and Reduction of Animals in Research (NC3Rs), Parkinson's UK, Prostate Cancer UK, Telethon Italy, the Wellcome Trust, the World Health Organization and Worldwide Cancer Research (formerly Association for International Cancer Research).

== See also ==
- MEDLINE
- PubMed Central
- Hyper Articles en Ligne
- Isidore (platform)
