= Latin American and Caribbean Health Sciences Literature =

The Literatura Latino-Americana e do Caribe em Ciências da Saúde (in Portuguese), acronym LILACS, and previously called Latin American Index Medicus, is an on-line bibliographic database in medicine and health sciences, maintained by the Latin American and Caribbean Center on Health Sciences Information (also known as BIREME), located in São Paulo, Brazil. Similar to MEDLINE, which was developed by the United States National Library of Medicine, it contains bibliographic references to papers that have been published in a set of scientific and medical journals of the region, and that are not covered by MEDLINE.

The database is structured using the LILACS Methodology, which comprises:

- LILDBI-Web, and more recently, FI-ADMIN Software: programs used to make the description and indexing of documents, in addition to performing data checking, required by the Methodology;
- SeCS Software - Periodical Publications Collection Control System: used to control the collection of journals and control the titles of magazines;
- DeCS vocabulary - Health Sciences Descriptors: controlled vocabulary used in indexing to ensure accurate retrieval of bibliographic references;
- Bibliographic Description Manual (7th revised edition - 2008): guides you in filling in the LILDBI-Web and FI-ADMIN data fields;
- Indexing Manual: guides in indexing the documents described in LILDBI-Web and FI-ADMIN. LILACS indexing follows an indexing policy quite similar to the NLM - National Library of Medicine;
- Document Selection Guide: guides in the selection of documents and journal articles that will be inserted in the LILACS database.

== Bibliography ==
- LILACS Methodology
