= SciELO =

Bibliographic database of open access journals

- Producer: FAPESP - BIREME (Brazil)
- Languages: English, Portuguese, Spanish

Access
- Cost: Free

Coverage
- Disciplines: Multidisciplinary
- Record depth: Index, abstract & full-text
- Format coverage: Academic journal articles
- Geospatial coverage: Latin America, Iberian Peninsula, South Africa
- No. of records: 573,525

Links
- Website: scielo.org

SciELO (Scientific Electronic Library Online) is a bibliographic database, digital library, and cooperative electronic publishing model of open access journals. SciELO was created to meet the scientific communication needs of developing countries and provides an efficient way to increase visibility and access to scientific literature. Originally established in Brazil in 1997, today there are 16 countries in the SciELO network and its journal collections: Argentina, Bolivia, Brazil, Chile, Colombia, Costa Rica, Cuba, Ecuador, Mexico, Paraguay, Peru, Portugal, South Africa, Spain, Uruguay, and Venezuela.

SciELO was initially supported by the São Paulo Research Foundation (FAPESP) and the Brazilian National Council for Scientific and Technological Development (CNPq), along with the Latin American and Caribbean Center on Health Sciences Information (BIREME). SciELO provides a portal that integrates and provides access to all of the SciELO network sites. Users can search across all SciELO collections or limit the search by a single country collection, or browse by subject area, publisher, or journal title.

== Database and projects ==
By October 2015 the database contained:

- 1,249 journals
- 39,651 issues (journal numbers)
- 573,525 research articles
- 13,005,080 citations (sum of the number of items in each article's reference list)

from different countries, universally accessible for free open access, in full-text format. The SciELO Project's stated aims are to "envisage the development of a common methodology for the preparation, storage, dissemination and evaluation of scientific literature in electronic format". All journals are published by a special software suite which implements a scientific electronic virtual library accessed via several mechanisms, including a table of titles in alphabetic and subject list, subject and author indexes and a search engine.

=== History ===
Project's launch timeline:

- 1997: Beginning of the development of SciELO as a FAPESP supported project in partnership with BIREME.
- 1998: SciELO goes live.
- 1998: Chile's national research agency CONICYT asks to be considered as a pilot project outside of Brazil.
- 1999-2000: Chile joined as a regional collection, project supported by CONICYT.
- 2002: the CNPq also began its support for SciELO.
- 2005: Argentina joined as a regional collection, project supported by CONICET
- 2009: South Africa joined as a regional collection, project supported by ASSAf.
- 2012: the SciELO Books project is launched.
- 2013: the SciELO Citation Index is integrated into Thomson Reuters' Web of Knowledge (WoS), covering about 650 journals total, 300 more than the 350 already in the WoS.
- 2017 SciELO announced that they were setting up a preprints server – SciELO Preprints.

== Open access ==
In 2013 the Latin American SciELO project completed 15 years of free publishing. Open access has long emphasized access to scholarly materials. However, open access can also mean access to the means of producing visible and recognized journals. This issue is particularly important in developing and emergent countries, where there are other benefits of and challenges for publishing scientific journals in and by emerging countries. SciELO also has a blog entitled "SciELO in Perspective" where scientists and researchers publish articles aimed towards broader audiences.

== Technology ==
Articles are sent to SciELO by publishers in XML or HTML+SGML, using a variety of article DTDs. The SGML DTD was used until 2013, when SciELO started to offer the Journal Article Tag Suite (JATS) DTD standard for XML deposites. Using to Markup XML a macro in a proprietary desktop application (Microsoft Office Word - DOCX).

In the SciELO portals, received JATS-articles are converted via XSLT to HTML, and "SGML+HTML pack" articles use the HTML content (in general a handmade PDF-to-HTML conversion). This process may reveal errors that are reported back to the publisher for correction. Graphics are also converted to standard formats and sizes. The original and converted forms are archived. The converted form is moved into a relational database, along with associated files for graphics, multimedia, or other associated data. Many publishers also provide PDFs of their articles, and these are made available without change.

Bibliographic citations are (SGML or XML) parsed and automatically linked to the associated articles in SciELO and resources on publishers' Web sites. Unresolvable references, such as journals or particular articles not yet available at one of these sources, are tracked in the database and automatically come "live" when the resources become available.

An in-house indexing system provides search capability.

=== Conversion tools ===
Multiple tools exist to allow creation, editing and conversion for SciELO XML. They range from simple crude converters to full blown XML converters.

==== To SciELO XML ====
- MS Word documents and OpenOffice (LibreOffice) documents to SciELO:
  - Typeset: provides automated set of converters for MS-Word to SciELO XML.
  - OxGarage: can convert documents from various XML formats
  - meTypeset: meTypeset "is a fork of the OxGarage stack" "to convert from Microsoft Word .docx format to SciELO XML via JATS XML (using XSLT).
  - Word to Markdown to SciELO XML: This can be done through Pandoc. This process might involve loss of information for certain complex manuscripts containing equations & tables.

==== From SciELO XML ====
Take SciELO XML as input, produce a certain output format

The common formats for Production phase are mentioned below:

- from SciELO to HTML: (for web versions)
  - JATS Preview Stylesheets (canonical XSLT conversion), see classical (2013) conversor.
  - eLife Lens converts NLM XML to JSON for displaying using HTML and Javascript.
  - Typeset Publisher Solution
- from SciELO to PDF:
  - Typeset converter for SciELO XML to PDF
  - some JATS Preview Stylesheets, XSLT + XSL-FO conversion.
- from SciELO to ePUB: (for mobile versions)
  - eXtyles

== Controversy ==
In July 2015, Jeffrey Beall, an American librarian, posted an article on his blog referring to the two largest Latin American open access databases (SciELO and Redalyc) as "favelas", which is a derogatory Portuguese term for a slum. Beall stated:

"Many North American scholars have never even heard of these meta-publishers or the journals they aggregate. Their content is largely hidden, the neighborhood remote and unfamiliar."

Among the responses is a motion passed by the Brazilian Forum of Public Health Journals Editors and the Associação Brasileira de Saúde Coletiva (Abrasco, Brazilian Public Health Association). The motion takes exception to Beall's characterization, draws attention to the underlying "ethnocentric prejudice", and corrects factual inaccuracies. As a counterpoint to Beall's "neocolonial point of view", the motion draws attention to work by Vessuri, Guedon and Cetto emphasizing the value of initiatives such as SciELO and Redalyc (also targeted by Beall) to the development of science in Latin America and globally: "In fact, Latin America is using the OA publishing model to a far greater extent than any other region in the world…. Also, because the sense of public mission remains strong among Latin American universities… these current initiatives demonstrate that the region contributes more and more to the global knowledge exchange while positioning research literature as a public good."

== See also ==
- List of academic databases and search engines
- PubMed Central (PMC)
- Redalyc (similar project)
- Open access in Spain
  - Carlos III Health Institute
