= Latindex =

Latindex (Regional Cooperative Online Information System for Scholarly Journals from Latin America, the Caribbean, Spain and Portugal) is a bibliographical information system available for free consultation. Established as a network in 1997, the project is based on the cooperation of 17 national resource centers that operate in a coordinated scheme for the gathering and dissemination of relevant information and data on the Iberoamerican journals.

The aims of Latindex are disseminating, fostering and developing both the scientific and the editorial fields, and to fulfill their information needs in the best possible manner. Latindex was created following the recommendations arose in the First Workshop on Latin American Scientific Publications held in Guadalajara, Mexico in 1994. The idea was adopted by the National Autonomous University of Mexico in 1995, and in February 1997, the First Technical Meeting was held in Mexico City with the commitment of four countries (Brazil, Cuba, Venezuela and Mexico). With the incorporation of Spain and Portugal in 1998, Latindex evolved towards an Iberoamerican system.

== Products ==
1. Directory. It’s a Comprehensive inventory of scholarly journals. Available since 1997 it provides basic bibliographic data of each title such as publisher, contact address, subject coverage, prices, frequency, etc. The online version of the Directory contains detailed information of almost 17,000 journals from 30 countries.

2. Catalogue. Set online in March 2002. Being a subset of the Directory, it contains a selection of journals that fulfill a series of international quality criteria. Titles are classified according to a previously agreed international quality parameters such as peer review procedures, coverage in international databases, abstracts and keywords in more than one language, international editorial boards, among a total of 33 parameters for printed journals and 36 for electronic journals. The list of parameters met by every title is shown in each record. To date, more than 3,500 journals have been rated and included in this catalogue.

3. Electronic journals. Offers direct access to a growing collection of Iberoamerican online journals offering full text articles. Currently links to almost 3,000 titles.

Latindex website is also a valuable resource to find up-to-date information of materials on scientific journals practices and editorial standards, useful for librarians, researchers and students. Likewise, the site offers PowerPoint presentations from a number of seminars and workshops organized in several of the participant countries. The News Section presents information about events and news of the professional activities developed in the Library and Information Science field, mainly from Iberoamerica.

== Participating institutions ==
The general coordination of the system is based in the Department of Latin American Bibliography, part of the Assistant Office for Information Services of the General Directorate for Libraries (DGB) of the National Autonomous University of Mexico (UNAM). In each participant country there is an institution responsible for the input of data to the system’s databases.

- Consejo Nacional de Investigaciones Científicas y Técnicas (CONICET) (Argentina)
- Centro Argentino de Información Científica y Tecnológica (CAICyT) (Argentina)
- Instituto Brasileño de Información en Ciencia y Tecnología (IBICT) (Brazil)
- Comisión Nacional de Investigación Científica y Tecnológica (CONICYT) (Chile)
- Departamento de Información (Chile)
- Instituto Colombiano para el Desarrollo de la Ciencia y la Tecnología "Francisco José de Caldas" (COLCIENCIAS) (Colombia)
- Universidad de Costa Rica (Costa Rica)
- Instituto de Información Científica y Tecnológica (IDICT) (Cuba)
- Biblioteca Nacional de Ciencia y Tecnología (BNCT) (Cuba)
- Universidad APEC (UNAPEC) (Dominican Republic)
- Fundación para la Ciencia y la Tecnología (FUNDACYT) (Ecuador)
- Red Europea de Información y Documentación sobre América Latina (REDIAL) (France)
- Universidad de San Carlos de Guatemala (Guatemala)
- Biblioteca Central (Guatemala)
- Universidad Nacional Autónoma de México (UNAM) (Mexico)
- Dirección General de Bibliotecas (Mexico)
- Dirección General de Servicios de Cómputo Académico (Mexico)
- Instituto de Física (Mexico)
- Universidad de Panamá (Panama)
- Sistema de Bibliotecas (Panama)
- Consejo Nacional de Ciencia y Tecnología (CONCYTEC) (Peru)
- Centro Nacional de Documentación e Información Científica y Tecnológica (CENDICYT) (Peru)
- Ministerio de Ciencia y Enseñanza Superior (Portugal)
- Fundación para la Ciencia y la Tecnología (Portugal)
- Serviço de Informação e Documentação (Portugal)
- Universidad de Puerto Rico (Puerto Rico)
- Escuela Graduada de Ciencias y Tecnologías de la Información (Puerto Rico)
- Consejo Superior de Investigaciones Científicas (CSIC) (Spain)
- Instituto de Estudios Documentales sobre Ciencia y Tecnología (ex-CINDOC) (Spain)
- Ministerio del Poder Popular para Ciencia y Tecnología (Venezuela)
- FONACIT - Centro de Documentación (Venezuela)

An agreement was reached between Latindex and REDIAL (European Network for Information and Documentation on Latin America) in 2005 in order to include in Latindex those journals published in Europe which content was relevant to Latin American issues.

== Events ==
=== Latindex Technical Meetings ===
A total of 14 annual technical meetings have been held since 1997 to date in the different participant countries:

=== Seminars and Workshops ===
Latindex has organized in Latin America, a series of seminars and workshops addressed to professional editors of scholarly journals with the objective of sharing experiences and practices about publishing standards and the editor’s work.

== Funding ==
Additional support for the development of the system has been provided by the partners themselves. Specific activities have been supported in part by UNESCO (Science Sector -Paris and regional Montevideo offices); the International Council for Science (through ICSU Press and COSTED); the Third World Academy of Sciences (TWAS); the Organization of American States (OAS), and the International Network for the Availability of Scientific Publications (INASP).
